= Raúl Elenes Angulo =

Mexican politician (born 1966)

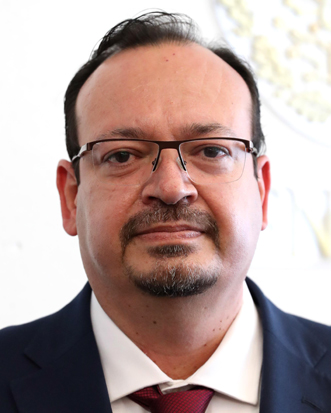
- Elenes Angulo in 2018

Senator of the Congress of the Union for Sinaloa
- In office 9 March 2021 – 31 August 2024
- Preceded by: Rubén Rocha Moya
- Succeeded by: Imelda Castro Castro

National Commissioner of Aquaculture and Fisheries
- In office 3 December 2018 – 9 March 2021
- President: Andrés Manuel López Obrador
- Preceded by: Mario Gilberto Aguilar Sánchez
- Succeeded by: Octavio Alberto Almada Palafox

Deputy of the Congress of Sinaloa
- In office 1 December 2001 – 30 November 2004

Personal details
- Born: 6 December 1966 (age 59) Mazatlán, Sinaloa, Mexico
- Party: Morena

Raúl de Jesús Elenes Angulo (born 9 December 1966) is a Mexican politician who most recently served as a Senator of the Congress of the Union from Sinaloa from 2021 to 2024, taking office from Rubén Rocha Moya took leave as he began his campaign for Governor of Sinaloa. He is a member of Morena.

During his tenure, Elenes Angulo also received criticism from some about his lack of proposed legislation.

He previously served as the National Commissioner of Aquaculture and Fisheries under Andrés Manuel López Obrador and as a deputy of the Congress of Sinaloa.

In the early stages of the COVID-19 pandemic in Mexico, Elenes Angulo tested positive for the virus.
