= Rubén Rocha Moya =

Mexican politician

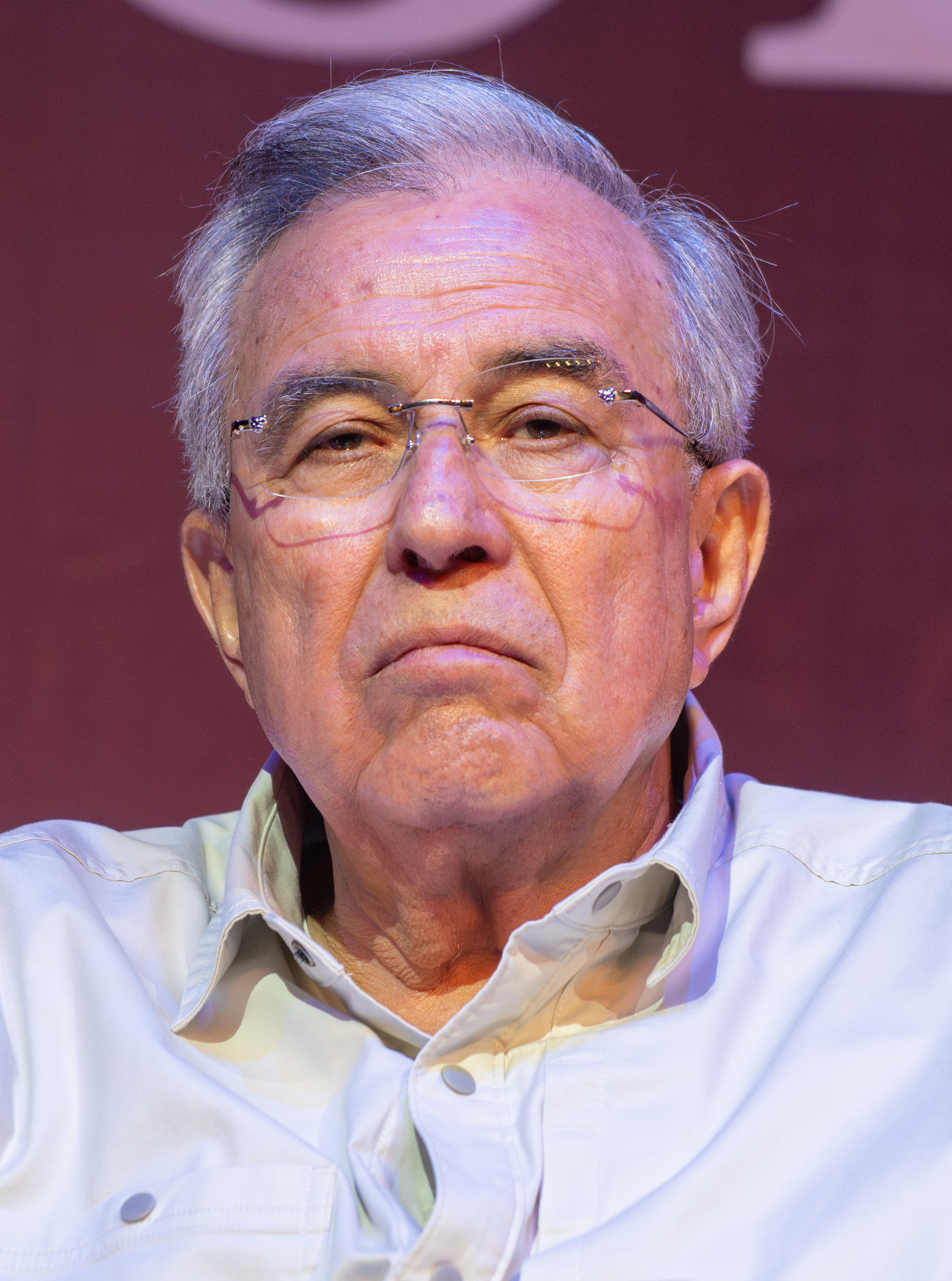
- Rocha in 2023

Governor of Sinaloa
- Absent
- In office 21 August 2026 – 23 August 2026
- Preceded by: Yeraldine Bonilla Valverde
- Succeeded by: Graciela Domínguez Nava
- In office 1 November 2021 – 2 May 2026
- Preceded by: Quirino Ordaz Coppel
- Succeeded by: Yeraldine Bonilla Valverde (acting)

Member of the Senate of the Republic
- In office 29 August 2018 – 5 March 2021
- Preceded by: Aarón Irízar López
- Succeeded by: Raúl Elenes Angulo
- Constituency: Sinaloa

Rector of the Autonomous University of Sinaloa
- In office 8 June 1993 – 7 June 1997
- Preceded by: David Moreno Lizárraga
- Succeeded by: Jorge Luis Guevara Reynaga

Member of the Congress of Sinaloa
- In office 1 December 1983 – 30 November 1986
- Constituency: Proportional representation

Personal details
- Born: 15 June 1949 (age 77) Batequitas, Badiraguato, Sinaloa, Mexico
- Party: National Regeneration Movement (since 2017)
- Other political affiliations: Party of the Democratic Revolution (1998–2002); Unified Socialist Party of Mexico (1983–1987)
- Spouse: Socorro Ruiz Carrasco (m. 1973; died 2014)
- Children: 4

Rubén Rocha Moya (born 15 June 1949) is a Mexican politician and educator who served as the Governor of Sinaloa from 2021 to 2026. (Note: First from 1 November 2021 to 2 May 2026, then from 21 August to 23 August 2026) A member of the National Regeneration Movement (MORENA), Rocha previously served in the Senate from 2018 to 2021.

Rocha was previously the rector of the Autonomous University of Sinaloa (UAS) in the 1990s, a state deputy in 1983–1986, and a gubernatorial candidate in both 1986 and 1998.

In April 2026, Rocha was indicted by the United States Department of Justice on charges of conspiring with the Sinaloa Cartel. Rocha left his office as Governor of Sinaloa temporarily on 2 May 2026, with Yeraldine Bonilla Valverde took office as interim governor, that same day. Rocha returned to his office on 21 August 2026, but after backlash from his own party, he once again requested leave after being only one day in office, being approved on 23 August 2026.

== Early life ==
Rocha Moya was born in Batequitas, a locality in Badiraguato, Sinaloa, as one of six children. He obtained his degree as a mathematics teacher from the Escuela Normal Superior de Oaxaca. It was his time at a rural teachers' school in Sonora that introduced him to left-wing thought; he rose through the ranks and served as the general secretary of the Federation of Rural Socialist Students from 1968 to 1969. In his first job, as a teacher in Ciudad Obregón, Sonora, Rocha joined the Mexican Communist Party.

In 1972, Rocha returned to his home state and became a physics and mathematics teacher at the preparatory school in Guamúchil, where he became the head of the campus. The next year, Rocha was successful in affiliating the institution with the Autonomous University of Sinaloa. He would remain in Guamúchil until 1980, when he was offered a position as press secretary for the university's teachers' union; during this time, he successfully helped fight attempts by Governor Antonio Toledo Corro to remove the preparatory schools from the UAS system. In 1983, Rocha was named the union's general secretary.

== Political career ==
=== First legislative position and UAS rectorship ===
As a result of his ascendancy in the UAS union, Rocha was named to the party list of deputies to the state legislature for the Unified Socialist Party of Mexico, becoming part of the state's first group of leftist legislators. After his three-year term ended in 1986, Rocha Moya was a gubernatorial candidate for the leftist Movimiento Popular Sinaloense party and then took a break to pursue his master's degree at the Universidad Autónoma de Querétaro.

Rocha returned to Sinaloa in 1989 at the invitation of David Moreno Lizárraga, the newly elected UAS rector, to serve as his general secretary, the second-highest leadership position. This set Rocha up to be elected four years later as rector, where he served until 1997. During his tenure, the university began offering its first doctorate degree, constructed new sports facilities and connected its campuses in Culiacán, Los Mochis and Mazatlán by fiber-optic link.

=== After the UAS: second gubernatorial bid ===
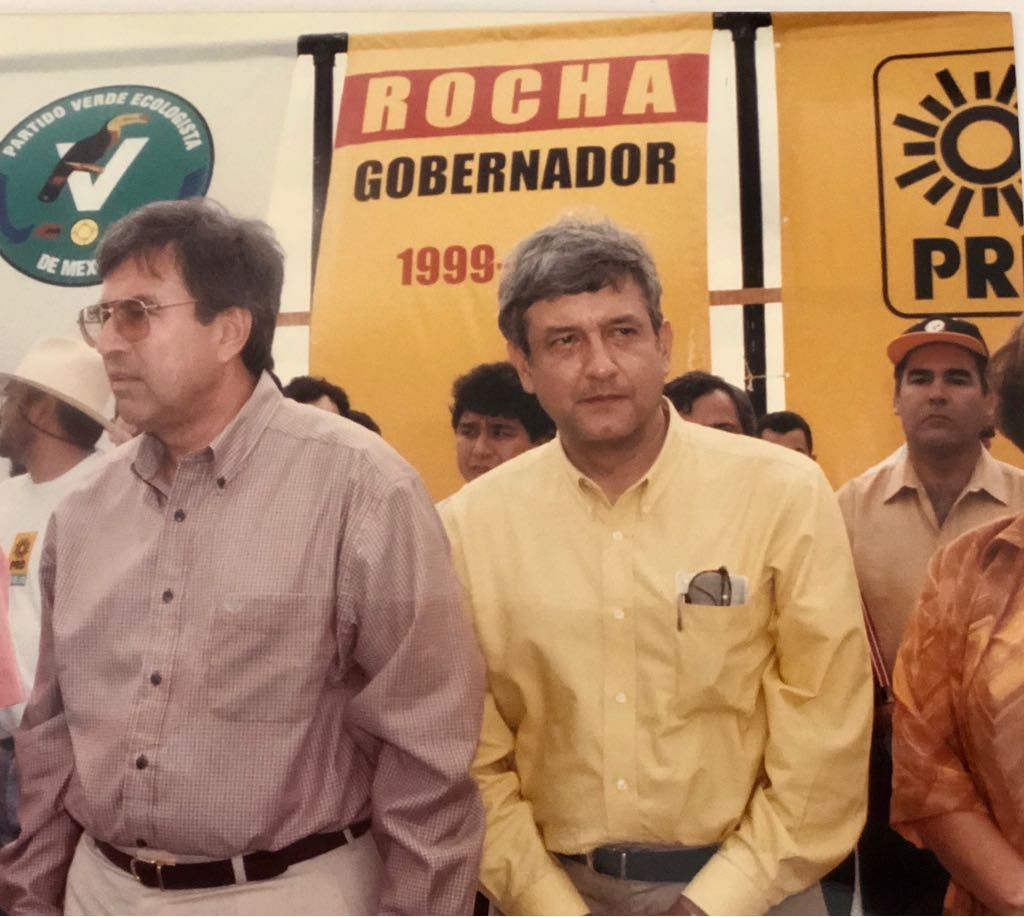
Rocha Moya (left) with Andrés Manuel López Obrador on the campaign trail in 1998

A year after the end of his rectorship, Rocha made a second bid for governor of Sinaloa in 1998, this time as the candidate of the Party of the Democratic Revolution (PRD). Rocha finished third, while the PRD obtained its best result in the state to date, winning one mayoral race and five seats in the legislature. After the election, Rocha became a PRD member, and one internal faction proposed him as the head of the state party; other officials, seeing Rocha as a threat to their careers, blocked him from running, which led the national party organization to sanction the state committee and to his resignation from the PRD in 2002.

From 2005 to 2010, Rocha served as the coordinator of advisors to Institutional Revolutionary Party governor Jesús Vizcarra Calderón. Despite the connection to a PRI official, Rocha noted that he never stopped supporting leftist candidates and never became a PRI member.

In 2013, due to his PRI connections, Rocha was named the deputy director of training at the Institute for Social Security and Services for State Workers (ISSSTE). He served in that position until Governor Quirino Ordaz Coppel asked him to serve as an adviser again, even though Rocha had become a member of MORENA, having known Andrés Manuel López Obrador since his time in the PRD.

=== Senate ===
In 2018, Rocha Moya ran for elected office for the first time in two decades. The Senate ticket of Rocha and Imelda Castro Castro, for the Juntos Haremos Historia alliance, received more than 604,000 votes—nearly twice the second-place finishers—and both candidates won election.

In the 54th Congress, Rocha served on five commissions and was president of the Education Commission. During his presidency, the Senate approved a new General Law of Higher Education, requiring the Mexican state to ensure free access to the higher education system beginning in 2022.

In 2020, while a senator, he obtained a law degree from the National Autonomous University of Mexico (UNAM).

=== 2021 gubernatorial campaign ===
In March 2021, MORENA named Rocha Moya as its gubernatorial candidate for Sinaloa; he had been tabbed as a potential candidate for months, though rumors circulated that he would be offered the position of Secretary of Public Education. He took leave from the Senate, where his alternate, Raúl Elenes Angulo, was sworn in. He was also named the candidate of the state-level Sinaloa Party (PAS), even though even Rocha Moya and López Obrador had questioned the Morena-PAS alliance.

Polling before the election showed a close race with Va por México coalition candidate Mario Zamora Gastélum. However, quick count results on election night showed the race to have been far less competitive, with Rocha Moya obtaining 55 percent of the vote.

== Allegations of links to organized crime ==
=== Allegations prior to U.S. indictment ===
==== Zambada letter and Cuén Ojeda killing ====
On 25 July 2024, Ismael "El Mayo" Zambada, a co-founder of the Sinaloa Cartel, was abducted at a ranch outside Culiacán and flown to the United States, where he was arrested. Héctor Melesio Cuén Ojeda, a former rector of the Autonomous University of Sinaloa and a former ally of Rocha Moya, was killed at the property the same day.

In a letter released by his lawyer on 10 August, Zambada said that he had gone to the ranch expecting to mediate a dispute between Rocha Moya and Cuén, and that Joaquín Guzmán López had told him the governor would be present. Rocha Moya claimed that he had no knowledge of any such meeting and had been in the United States visiting family that day. The Institutional Revolutionary Party (PRI) called for his resignation and Citizens' Movement (MC) asked the federal government to distance itself from him.

The Sinaloa state prosecutor's office reported that Cuén had been shot during an attempted robbery at a petrol station north of Culiacán. The federal Attorney General's Office (FGR) found that account inconsistent with the evidence and concluded that he had been killed at the ranch. The exposure of the cover-up culminated in the resignation of the state prosecutor, Sara Bruna Quiñónez Estrada, in August 2024.

==== Public and journalistic allegations ====
In September 2024, amid infighting in the Sinaloa Cartel, cartel banners and flyers appeared in several locations in Sinaloa, including Culiacán, Los Mochis, and Mazatlán. According to media reports, some contained images of individuals identified as members of "Los Chapitos" alongside Rocha Moya and Senator Enrique Inzunza Cázarez, and alleged collaboration between political figures and the faction. In November 2024, a banner in Culiacán called for the cancellation of the Expo Ganadera event, accused the governor of supporting the Chapitos faction, and included threats against him and his family; the event was subsequently canceled.

Journalist Anabel Hernández reported that Rocha Moya’s political rise and 2021 gubernatorial campaign were allegedly facilitated by factions of the Sinaloa Cartel, including "Los Chapitos" and intermediaries linked to Ismael "El Mayo" Zambada, framing it as part of a broader system of "narco-politics" in Sinaloa. Hernández pointed to the contents of Zambada's letter as evidence of close political-criminal coordination. She also suggested that inconsistencies surrounding Cuén Ojeda’s killing and the official narrative of Zambada’s capture indicated a possible state-level cover-up, and in later 2025 commentary reiterated claims of systemic collusion between political actors and organized crime, particularly through protection arrangements in exchange for electoral support.

In February 2026, legal and civil society organizations submitted a criminal complaint before the FGR, accusing the governor of offenses including organized crime, misuse of public office, and concealment. The complaint was supported by documentation and arguments citing an alleged "crisis of insecurity" in the state, purported links between public officials and criminal groups, and claims that Rocha Moya had previously acknowledged the need to reach agreements with organized crime during his 2021 gubernatorial campaign. The complainants also pointed to the handling of the killing of Héctor Melesio Cuén Ojeda and the circumstances surrounding the July 2024 capture of Ismael "El Mayo" Zambada as part of the alleged evidence.

In late April 2026, Los Angeles Times reported that the United States government had revoked Rocha Moya's visa in 2025.

=== U.S. indictment ===
In a broader U.S. policy shift that began treating cartel-related activities as acts of terrorism, United States authorities submitted requests for the provisional arrest of Rocha Moya and other accused individuals for purposes of extradition. The requests were received on 28 April through the Secretariat of Foreign Affairs, which referred the matter to the Attorney General's Office (FGR) for evaluation.

On 29 April 2026, U.S. prosecutors unsealed an indictment in the U.S. District Court for the Southern District of New York charging Rocha Moya with conspiring with the Sinaloa Cartel. U.S. prosecutors alleged that Rocha accepted bribes and received electoral assistance from the cartel in exchange for providing political protection to its members. According to press reports and the indictment, this protection was instrumental in facilitating the mass shipment of fentanyl into the United States, as state resources were allegedly used to shield the cartel's laboratory operations and logistical routes from federal interference. The indictment also named nine other current and former officials, including Senator Enrique Inzunza Cázarez and Culiacán Mayor Juan de Dios Gámez Mendívil, both considered potential gubernatorial candidates for the upcoming 2027 elections. Rocha Moya denied all allegations, describing the indictment as a violation of Mexico’s sovereignty and constitutional order, stating:

This attack is not directed solely at me, but at the Fourth Transformation movement, its iconic leaders, and the Mexican men and women who represent that cause.

In response, President Claudia Sheinbaum and other members of the Morena party expressed their support for Rocha, questioning the lack of "conclusive physical evidence", and suggesting the charges were politically motivated. The FGR rejected the extradition request, citing a lack of evidence and necessary documents, and requested that U.S. authorities provide additional evidentiary materials to support the case.

On 1 May, Rocha Moya requested a temporary leave of absence from his position to facilitate an investigation by the FGR into allegations against him. It was later reported that on 6 May, the Financial Intelligence Unit (UIF) issued Agreement 156/2026, which ordered the freezing of bank accounts belonging to Rocha Moya.

Rocha Moya resumed office on 21 August 2026 but requested a further indefinite leave of absence the following day.

== Personal life ==
In 1973, Rocha married Socorro Ruiz Carrasco, with whom he had four children; Ruiz died in 2014.

== Notes ==
Political offices
Preceded by Quirino Ordaz Coppel	Governor of Sinaloa; 2021–2026	Succeeded by Yeraldine Bonilla Valverde
Preceded by Yeraldine Bonilla Valverde	Governor of Sinaloa; 2026	Succeeded by Graciela Domínguez Nava
