= Infighting in the Sinaloa Cartel =

Series of confrontations

- Part of the aftermath of the Capture of El Mayo and the Mexican drug war
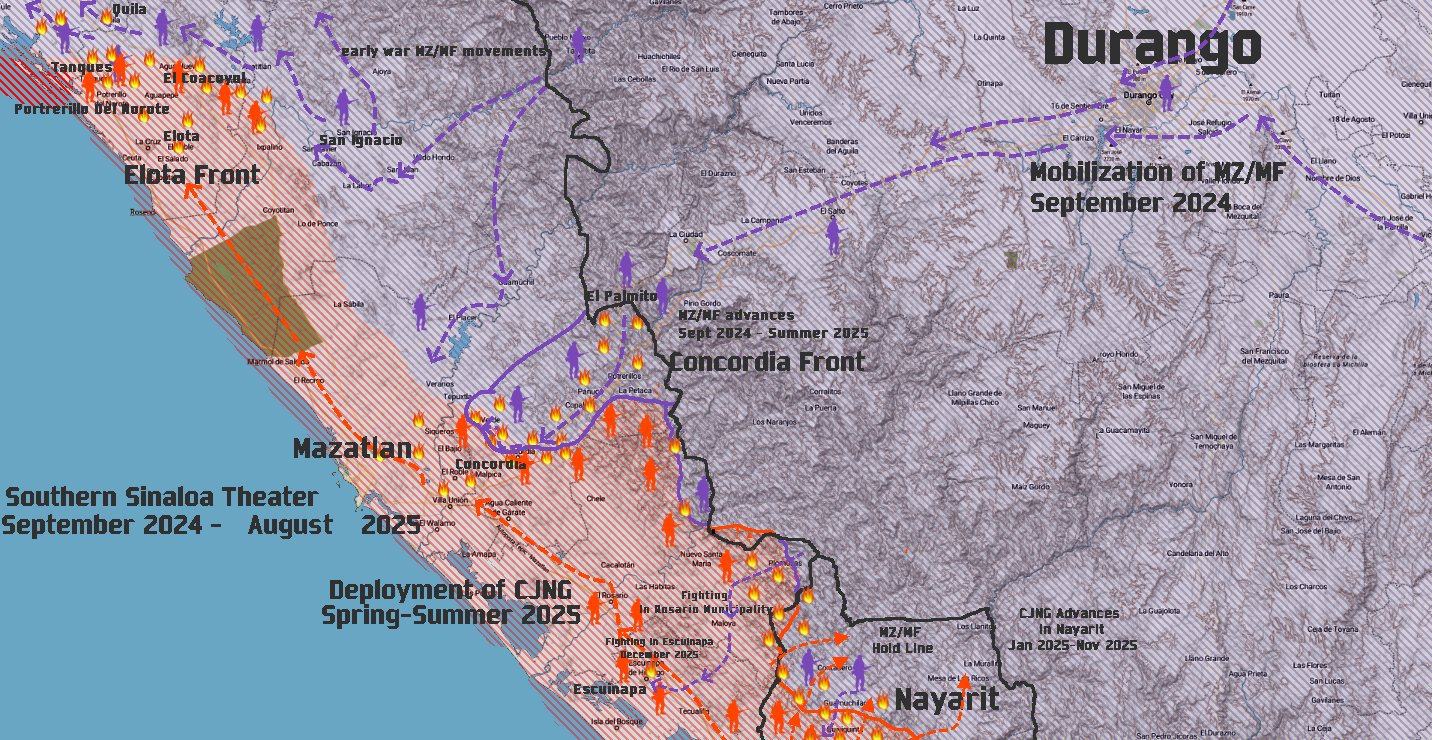
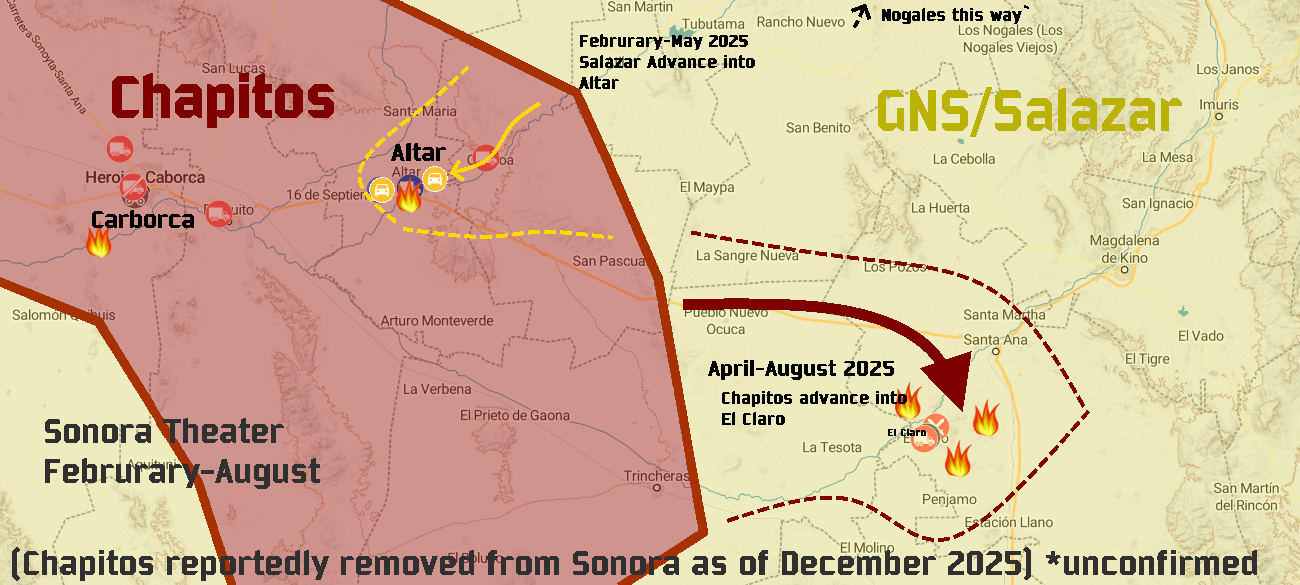
- Top: Movements of Belligerents In Southern Sinaloa (Sept 2024–Summer 2025) Bottom: Advances in Sonora Theater (February 2025-August 2025) Mayiza control Chapitos/CJNG control Chapitos control (Sonora) Los Salazar control (Sonora)
Date	9 September 2024 – present (2 years, 1 month, 2 weeks and 6 days)
Location	Sinaloa (spillover into Chihuahua, Durango, Nayarit, Sonora, and Zacatecas)
Status	Ongoing; "El Chapo Isidro" forms alliance with La Mayiza in Early May 2025; Chapitos form alliance with CJNG in May 2025

Belligerents
Mexico	Fuerzas Especiales Union: Los Chapitos; Gente Del Guano; Jalisco New Generation Cartel; Juárez Cartel; La Línea; Tijuana Cartel	Mayo Flaco/Mayo Zambada (MZ/MF): La Mayiza; Guasave Cartel; Los Salazar; Northeast Cartel

Commanders and leaders
(Mexico) Claudia Sheinbaum; (Mexico) Ricardo Trevilla Trejo; (Mexico) Raymundo Pedro Morales Ángeles; (Mexico) Omar García Harfuch	Iván Archivaldo Guzmán Salazar; Jesús Alfredo Guzmán Salazar; Aureliano Guzmán Loera; Óscar Noé Medina González †; Jorge Humberto Figueroa Benítez †; Nemesio Oseguera Cervantes X; Audias Flores Silva (surrendered); Juan Carlos Valencia González; Enedina Arellano Félix	Ismael Zambada Sicairos; Juan José Ponce Félix; Alfonso Limón Sánchez; El Changuito Ántrax; Alejandro Cabrera Sarabia; Fausto Isidro Meza Flores (surrendered); Crispín Salazar Zamorano; Juan Cisneros Treviño

Units involved
Mexican Armed Forces; Mexican Army; Special Forces Corps; Mexican Air Force; Mexican Navy; Naval Infantry Corps; Mexican National Guard; Sinaloa State Police	Los Chapitos: "Los Ninis"; "La Numerada"; "Los Chimales"; "Los Duendes"; "Los Gabitos/Cascos"; “Los Gavilanes”	La Mayiza: "Grupo Flechas - Operativa MZ"; "Grupo De Reacción Bruno"; "Los Rugrats"; "Fuerzas Especiales 28"; "Los Rusos"; "Los Cabrera"; "Los Aqulies”; “Los Ranas”; "Los Reyna"; "Los Caninos"; "Papas Fritas"; Los Salazar: "Los Tejones"; "Dragones"; "Guerreros del Fantasma"; "Los Zodiakos"

Casualties and losses
- 4,000+ dead or missing

The Sinaloa Cartel War, occasionally referred to locally as the Third Culiacánazo (Note: “Culiacánazo” is a local Spanish word used to refer to major military/cartel confrontations in the city of Culiacán, and roughly translates into “Culicán Event” or “Culiacán Impact”. The Sinaloa Infighting is the third such event to be referred as such, with the first being the 2019 attempt to arrest Ovidio Guzman Lopez (Battle of Culiacan) and the second being the 2023 final capture and arrest of Ovidio Guzman Lopez (2023 Sinaloa Unrest).) is an ongoing internal armed conflict between factions of the Sinaloa Cartel, primarily in the Mexican state of Sinaloa and the surrounding states in northwestern Mexico.

The conflict began on 9 September 2024, when a faction of the cartel loyal to Ismael Zambada Sicarios (“El Mayo Flaco”) began fighting another faction of the cartel loyal to the sons of Joaquín Guzmán Loera (“El Chapo”), who they blamed for the abduction and arrest of Sinaloa Cartel co-founder Ismael Zambada (“El Mayo”) in July of the same year.

The abduction triggered a formal schism within the cartel and escalated into a multi-front war between the Mayo Flaco/Mayo Zambada (MZ/MF) faction (also known as La Mayiza) and the Los Chapitos faction, later drawing in external cartels and regional groups.

== Background ==
=== Structure and history of the Sinaloa Cartel ===
The Sinaloa Cartel has a decentralized leadership structure, with no single leader and no hierarchical chain of command. InSight Crime describes it as a network of cells that cooperate with one another, outsourcing much of its work abroad and within Mexico to local partners, with these cooperations being held together at the top by family ties and compadrazgo, or kinship. The International Crisis Group writes that as the organization expanded, its leadership "came to exert tight control of a federation of criminal groups and families with diverse origins and interests". The Armed Conflict Location and Event Data Project (ACLED) characterizes the arrangement as a federal structure that allows factions and allies to operate with full autonomy and in horizontal relations, without a rigid hierarchy.

That structure took shape in the late 1980s, after the collapse of the Guadalajara Cartel left a loose association of Sinaloa-rooted groups that Zambada (“El Mayo”), Joaquin Guzmán Loera (“El Chapo”), and their partners consolidated under their control. Each participant continued to run his own operations, staffed largely by relatives and close associates; other traffickers and local officials came to call Zambada's group La Mayiza.

Zambada, Guzmán and Juan José Esparragoza Moreno ("El Azul") consolidated the organization through the 1990s around strongholds in Sinaloa, Durango, and Chihuahua, the drug-producing region known as the Golden Triangle. The factions bribed and co-opted local, state and federal authorities; the most prominent case being Genaro García Luna, Mexico's secretary of public security from 2006 to 2012, convicted in the United States in 2024 of having supported the cartel for a decade in exchange for millions of dollars.

The organization had long preferred bribery to violence and alliances to battles, though it used force where it wanted to take territory. InSight Crime attributes its durability through decades of arrests and killings to this network structure, which allowed it both to replace lost members and to avoid attracting scrutiny for the violence it committed. A federation of autonomous cells depended on arbitration to hold together, and ACLED describes the surviving founders as figures whose role as mediators reduced the risk of direct conflict between the factions. Zambada, the last of them at liberty after evading arrest across a criminal career of four decades, was known for keeping a low profile and for a focus on business over violence.

=== Earlier internal ruptures ===
The Sinaloa Cartel had previously experienced fracturing within the cartel and their alliances. In 2002, Guzmán, Zambada, and Esparragoza met the Beltrán Leyva brothers to form what became known as the Sinaloa Federation, or Alianza de Sangre (Spanish: “Blood Alliance”). The alliance was held up by marriages between leadership: Alfredo Beltrán Leyva married a cousin of Guzmán's, Esparragoza married Guzmán's sister-in-law, and Guzmán later married a niece of another partner, Ignacio Coronel. When Rodolfo Carrillo Fuentes of the Juárez Cartel killed two of Guzmán's operatives in 2004 and Guzmán had him assassinated, Zambada and Esparragoza took Guzmán's side, beginning a war with the Juárez Cartel.

The Beltrán Leyva Organization would split from the cartel’s federation in 2008. When Mexican authorities arrested Alfredo Beltrán Leyva on 21 January 2008, Guzmán's son Iván Archivaldo was released from jail soon afterward, and Arturo Beltrán Leyva concluded that Guzmán had snitched on his brother to the authorities. In retaliation, Beltrán Leyva had one of Guzmán's other sons, Édgar, killed later that year outside a shopping center in Sinaloa, after which the BLO allied with Los Zetas, while the Sinaloa Cartel reached agreements with the Gulf Cartel and La Familia Michoacana. Guzmán, Zambada and Esparragoza remained aligned as the Sinaloa Federation against the BLO and Los Zetas. The fighting spread across Sinaloa, Chihuahua and Durango, and forcibly displaced hundreds of people; significant fighting subsided when a Mexican Marines operation killed Arturo Beltrán Leyva in Cuernavaca in December 2009.

Guzmán's arrest in January 2016 and extradition to the United States the following year set off a struggle in the resulting power vacuum, in which lieutenant Dámaso López Núñez ("El Licenciado") tried to take control of the organization from Guzmán's sons. In February 2017, Zambada survived an ambush attributed to López Núñez that also targeted two of Guzman’s sons. By this point, members of the Sinaloa Cartel loyal to Guzman’s sons would put down the revolt, and López Núñez was arrested and extradited to the United States in July 2018.

=== Factionalization between Los Chapitos and La Mayiza ===
Guzmán's previous arrest in February 2014 had prompted his sons to seek a larger role in the organization, which led to a series of disputes with La Mayiza. Iván Archivaldo Guzmán Salazar, Jesús Alfredo Guzmán Salazar, Ovidio Guzmán López, and Joaquín Guzmán López inherited parts of Guzmán’s operations, and became known collectively as Los Chapitos (Spanish: “The Little Chapos”). Friction between members loyal to Guzman’s sons and La Mayiza persisted after López Núñez’ arrest, with leaked Mexican military intelligence from 2019 to 2022 recording turf battles between armed cells of the two factions, and tensions between their leaders rising sharply after members of Zambada's family testified against Guzmán at his trial in New York in 2019. In June 2021, a group associated with Los Chapitos killed a La Mayiza operator known as “Morgan” and left a message threatening a member of Baja California-based Los Rusos (Spanish: “The Russians”), La Mayiza's principal enforcement wing; Los Rusos had previously broken with Los Chapitos after declining to take part in the effort to free Ovidio Guzmán López in 2019 during the Battle of Culiacán before then-President López Obrador ordered him released to prevent further violence.

From 2017 onwards, Los Chapitos acquired a virtual monopoly on drug dealing and fentanyl production in Sinaloa, before expanding into extortion, water distribution, and tobacco & e-cigarette trade in Culiacán. To guard the city against rivals, Los Chapitos built its own communications and surveillance systems, and put hundreds of local police officers on its payroll.

Ovidio Guzmán López was recaptured on 5 January 2023 in Culiacán, after which gunmen besieged the city and several other municipalities in Sinaloa, once again pressuring the Mexican government to release their leader. This ultimately failed, and Guzmán López was taken into custody & extradited to the United States on 16 September 2023, charged with fentanyl trafficking.

On 14 April 2023, the United States Department of Justice unsealed charges against all four brothers in the Southern District of New York, the Northern District of Illinois, and the District of Columbia, alongside chemical suppliers, laboratory managers, money launderers and weapons traffickers. Then-Attorney General Merrick Garland called the cartel's operation "the largest, most violent, and most prolific fentanyl trafficking operation in the world", and said it was fueled by Chinese precursor chemical and pharmaceutical companies. The DOJ separately described Los Chapitos as the more violent and aggressive faction of the cartel.

=== Capture of El Mayo and start of formal conflict ===
On 25 July 2024, Ismael Zambada was lured to a meeting organized by Los Chapitos member Joaquín Guzmán López at a ranch residence outside Culiacán, under the guise of settling a political dispute between Sinaloan politicians. When Zambada arrived, he was subdued, forced onto an airplane, sedated, and flown to Doña Ana County International Jetport at Santa Teresa, New Mexico, about 10 kilometers from the US-Mexico border, where both Zambada and Guzmán López were arrested upon landing. Following his arrest, Zambada’s son Ismael Zambada Sicarios (“El Mayo Flaco”) would take over his part of the Sinaloa Cartel, including La Mayiza.

In December 2025, Guzmán López admitted to taking part in the abduction, in an attempt to gain cooperation credit with American investigators. The arrest was understood by La Mayiza as a betrayal by Los Chapitos, accusing their leadership of delivering Zambada to United States authorities.

== Belligerents ==
Two of the cartel's factions fought each other:

- Los Chapitos, or La Chapiza, led by the sons of Joaquín "El Chapo" Guzmán;
- La Mayiza, or Los Mayos, led by loyalists of Ismael "El Mayo" Zambada.

At least twenty smaller armed cells have allied themselves with the factions in shifting alliances. Crisis Group identifies two further factions of comparable standing operating in Sinaloa: one led by Guzmán's brother Aureliano Guzmán Loera, alias El Guano, and the remnants of the Beltrán-Leyva Organization under Fausto Isidro Meza Flores. Of the two, only Meza Flores is reported to have entered the war.

=== La Mayiza ===
La Mayiza was built by Zambada and passed after his capture to his son Ismael Zambada Sicairos, alias Mayito Flaco. In a report published in May 2025, the Armed Conflict Location and Event Data Project (ACLED) described the faction as dominating operations in Durango and the rural areas of Sinaloa, with a strong presence in Baja California, Sonora, and Zacatecas; InSight Crime places its presence on the south side of Culiacán and in the Golden Triangle. Its armed wings, previously subject to clearer lines of command, operated with greater territorial autonomy after July 2024. By 2026, Crisis Group reported that the faction had taken most of Culiacán from Los Chapitos and was dominant in the south and east of the city.

Los Rusos, identified by the United States Department of Justice as the faction's principal armed wing, controlled trafficking routes in Baja California and around San Luis Río Colorado in northwestern Sonora under Juan José Ponce Félix, alias El Ruso. A second wing, Los Rugrats, operated from Laguna Colorada in Culiacán Municipality under Carlos Alberto Páez Pereda, alias Carlitos. A third, the Fuerzas Especiales Avendaño, sustained more casualties than any other wing in the war, according to the journalist Óscar Balderas. Los Rusos had broken with Los Chapitos after refusing to join the effort to free Ovidio Guzmán López during the 2019 Culiacanazo. Grupo Flecha, La Sombreiza, Los Cazadores, and Los Ántrax have also fought on this side.

On 18 September 2025, the Office of Foreign Assets Control of the United States Department of the Treasury added the faction to its sanctions list, blocking any assets they hold in the United States and barring Americans from dealing with them. Treasury said the faction traffics fentanyl, cocaine, marijuana, heroin, and methamphetamine into the United States, and that in Rosarito it engages in kidnapping, extortion, money laundering, and the corruption of local government.

=== Los Chapitos ===
Los Chapitos is led by Iván Archivaldo Guzmán Salazar and Jesús Alfredo Guzmán Salazar, the two of Guzmán's four sons who remain at large. ACLED's May 2025 report described the faction as operating primarily in Sinaloa, with a strong presence in Culiacán Municipality and on the state's Pacific coast as well as in Sonora and Baja California.

Los Ninis remains its best-known armed wing. Defense ministry records leaked by the hacktivist group Guacamaya indicate it was formed in 2016, after Guzmán's third capture, as the security detail for his sons. Its members were aged roughly twenty to thirty-five, and it kidnapped, tortured, and killed people it regarded as threats to its leaders, among them state officials, members of rival cartels, and traffickers within the Sinaloa Cartel itself. The wing declined after the arrest of its leader Néstor Isidro Pérez Salas, alias El Nini, in November 2023.

Los Chimales then took over the protective role. Founded in 2014 by Francisco Javier Zazueta Rosales, alias Pancho Chimal, who had once provided security for Zambada, it was led by José Ángel Canobbio Inzunza, alias El Güerito, until his arrest in February 2025. Los Pelones, under Omar Félix Loaiza, alias El 08, ran the faction's operations in Sonora and coordinated the fighting against Los Mayos in Culiacán after the war began; Loaiza was arrested in November 2024.

=== Alliances ===
The Cártel Independiente de Sonora was formed by three criminal families — Los Salazar, Los Paredes, and Los Cazadores — who had been Chapitos allies until Iván Archivaldo Guzmán barred them from trafficking fentanyl in order to concentrate that trade within the Guzmán family. Sánchez Valdés characterized their alliance with La Mayiza as confined to Sonora and liable to break, since they are not subordinate to Zambada Sicairos.

Meza Flores, alias Chapo Isidro, had sided with the Beltrán Leyva brothers when they split from the cartel in 2008. Mexican outlets reported in May 2025 that he had abandoned a neutral position and allied with La Mayiza to drive Los Chapitos out of northern Sinaloa. His faction, also known as the Guasave Cartel, grew during the war and established itself across northern Sinaloa, though it lost ground along the Sonora border while retaining influence around Ciudad Obregón and Guaymas.

The alliance between Los Chapitos and the Jalisco New Generation Cartel (CJNG) is reported to have begun in late 2024 and to have strengthened during 2025 as several of the faction's security chiefs were arrested, with the CJNG operator Audias Flores Silva, alias El Jardinero, formalizing it. The DEA's 2025 National Drug Threat Assessment reports that, according to Mexican news sources, the CJNG could capitalize on the conflict by siding with Los Chapitos against Los Mayos. Such an alliance, it adds, would have the potential to expand the two groups' territory, resources, firepower, and access to corrupt officials. InSight Crime characterized it as regional and transactional rather than a merger, confined to particular areas and to specific agreements.

=== Mexican security forces ===
Over the first two years of the war federal forces mobilized as many as 15,000 troops in Sinaloa at a time, detained almost 2,500 suspects, destroyed drug laboratories, and seized more than 68 tonnes of drugs.

== Course of the war ==
=== Outbreak of war (September–November 2024) ===
On the early morning of 9 September 2024, Zambada Sicairos authorized coordinated operations against members and areas held by Los Chapitos, with a senior field commander known as "El Comanche" issuing orders for synchronized strikes across Sinaloa, triggering open hostilities that marked the formal beginning of the conflict. A Mexican Army convoy encountered armed civilians in La Campiña, a neighborhood in eastern Culiacán and stronghold of Los Chapitos, where a shootout broke out, resulting in the death of a sergeant.

Violence escalated rapidly throughout the day, initially with additional clashes reported in nearby neighborhoods, as well as the city of Costa Rica, likely between Los Chapitos and La Mayiza. On the same day, a damaged vehicles were observed in Costa Rica following fighting, and more clashes were reported in southern Culiacán Municipality—a stronghold of the La Mayiza faction—and the neighboring municipalities of Badiraguato, Navolato, and Elota. By midday, a group of gunmen briefly boarded a public bus in Culiacán, issuing warnings to passengers and the driver about further violence. During the day's confrontations, authorities seized several armored civilian vehicles, firearms, and tactical equipment. Intense violence would continue in Culiacán throughout the following days.

Shortly after hostilities erupted, the Secretariat of Public Education and Culture, along with the Autonomous University of Sinaloa and the National Technological Institute of Mexico, suspended classes in affected areas. Public transportation services were widely disrupted, with numerous bus routes canceled. Many citizens sheltered in place for safety. Festivities for the Cry of Dolores were canceled.

President Andrés Manuel López Obrador dispatched additional army and National Guard units to Sinaloa, asserting that their primary mission was to ensure the safety and well-being of the local population amidst the conflict.

On 11 September, two members of Los Monguis, a group aligned with Los Chapitos, were killed in the Santa Fe area of Culiacán, reportedly by Mayiza-aligned forces. Separately, a large formation of armed fighters was recorded near Quilá, Sinaloa, with footage showing that the group had engaged in fighting.

In the weeks that followed, armed units aligned with the Mayiza faction deployed to Sinaloa to engage Los Chapitos, including Los Rusos and the Grupo Flechas (Spanish: “Arrow Group”) from Durango and Zacatecas, alongside Mayiza forces already operating within the state. Together, these units consolidated control over several eastern rural corridors of Sinaloa.

On 13 September, a Grupo Flechas convoy of improvised armoured vehicles and pick-up trucks associated with the Los Cabrera (Spanish: “The Goat Herders”) faction of La Mayiza was reportedly observed traveling from Durango toward Concordia, Sinaloa, to support Mayiza forces. On the same day, a decapitated body was found in Culiacan, Sinaloa

The violence had spread across Sinaloa by mid-September, with narco-blockades frequently appearing along Mexican Federal Highway 15 and numerous deaths reported in remote towns. The bodies of dead cartel members were occasionally found with sombreros or pizza slices—symbols linked to La Mayiza and Los Chapitos, respectively. The town of El Palmito in Concordia Municipality was temporarily evacuated on 14 September, leaving it a ghost town. On 15 September, the dead bodies of five La Mayiza members were found with sombreros on their heads, south of Culiacán.

On 18 September, the body of a Los Chapitos member was found near a gas station in El Melón, Sinaloa. On the same day, three executed bodies were found underneath the La Costerita bridge in southern Culiacán.

On 27 September, a van inscribed with "BIENVENIDOS A CULIACÁN" (Spanish: "WELCOME TO CULIACÁN") was found left in front of Taqueria La Rosca on La 15 in southern Culiacán, with multiple dead bodies inside.

On 30 September, local police in Culiacán were disarmed and removed from active duty after the Mexican Army seized their firearms to inspect permits and verify serial numbers. By that same day, the verified death toll had climbed to 118.

On 1 October, recently-inaugurated President Claudia Sheinbaum deployed a task force composed of Mexican Army soldiers, National Guard members, and agents from the National Intelligence Center to combat the escalating violence. On 2 October, she replaced Jesús Leana Ojeda with Guillermo Briseño Lobera as commander of the Third Military Region, whose jurisdiction covered all of Sinaloa.

The Associated Press reported that gunmen used cellphone and chat records to identify potential targets; armed men would stop individuals and search their contact lists, chat logs, or photos, and if they found any connection to a rival faction, the person was either executed or kidnapped.

On 4 October, five bodies staged with hats were left at the intersection of a side street and La 15 in Culiacán.

On 9 October, video footage showed Los Cazadores (Spanish: “The Hunters”) members, allied with Los Salazar and La Mayiza, conducting armed patrols in El Claro, Sonora, including at least one improvised armored vehicle.

On 17 October, in Culiacán, gunfire erupted outside the headquarters of the newspaper El Debate when an individual exited a vehicle and opened fire with a long gun. Two days later, a deliveryman on a motorcycle carrying printed editions of the newspaper was ambushed and kidnapped by armed assailants.

On 18 October, vehicles with bullet-damaged windshields were observed following fighting in El Diez, Sinaloa. A body believed to be connected to the clashes was later recovered.

On 20 October, burned-out vehicles were documented after fighting in Tanques, Sinaloa.

On 21 October, Mexican forces engaged in a deadly confrontation, resulting in the deaths of 19 cartel members and the capture of "El Max", a high-ranking member of La Mayiza. The following day, a narco-banner from Los Chapitos appeared in Culiacán, aimed at Ismael Zambada Sicairos, leader of the La Mayiza faction. The banner threatened to turn Zambada over to U.S. authorities and mocked him over the military operation leading to "El Max's" capture, claiming government support was on their side. In response, La Mayiza circulated pamphlets across Culiacán, setting up a hotline for citizens to report corruption involving Governor of Sinaloa Rubén Rocha Moya.

On 26 October, a cooler decorated with bows and pizza drawings was found containing a severed head, allegedly of a Los Chapitos member, along with a message directed at the group.

On 28 October, a small plane, reportedly linked to the Los Chapitos faction, dropped four bombs on Vascogil, Durango, a stronghold of the Cabrera Sarabia Organization, allies of La Mayiza.

On 3 November, a drone attack conducted by CJNG targeted MZ/MF approximately 4 kilometers northwest of Quiviquinta, Nayarit.

On 15 November, a video circulated showing armed men loyal to Omar Félix Loaiza ("El Pelón" / "El 08"), a recently arrested Chapitos-aligned figure, operating near Caborca, Sonora.

On 16 November, individuals reported to be members of MZ/MF were observed patrolling near the letras monument in Pueblos Unidos, Sinaloa.

On 17 November, MZ/MF fighters were filmed at La Pista in La Petaca, Sinaloa

On 18 November, armed clashes between MZ/MF and Los Chapitos occurred in Ímala, Sinaloa. On the same day, a member of "Los Rusos", aligned with MZ/MF, was photographed at the town's letras monument, with reports suggesting Chapitos forces had been expelled.

On 19 November, gunmen identifying as part of MZ/MF recorded themselves parading through the center of Ímala, Sinaloa. Additionally, a large group of armed individuals aligned with the MZ/MF assembled near the Sanalona reservoir before departing in convoy toward Sanalona, Sinaloa.

On 23 November, a Jeep Gladiator displaying extensive gunfire damage was found in Caborca, Sonora, reportedly targeted by Los Costeños, an Independent Sonora Cartel faction.

On 26 November, five bodies bearing signs of torture were left in front of the Universidad Autónoma de Sinaloa (Faculty of Agronomy) south of Culiacán, northwest of Costa Rica, Sinaloa. On the same date, a Chapitos-affiliated individual—possibly linked to Los Deltas or Los Pelones—was recorded driving along the highway toward Pitiquito, Sonora.

=== Heavy fighting in Central and Southern Sinaloa, and Government Intervention (December 2024 – April 2025) ===
During the first week of December, in the Coyame–Ojinaga area of Chihuahua, State Police seized multiple abandoned vehicles and recovered seven firearms, including five semi-automatic rifles and one .50-caliber Barrett sniper rifle.

On 6 December, members of Los Cabrera, aligned with the MZ faction, were reported gathering in El Mezquite, Chihuahua, approximately 43 kilometers from the border town of Ojinaga.

On 14 December, video footage showed MZ/MF-aligned gunmen positioned near the letras monument in El Dorado, Sinaloa.

on 17 December, sicarios affiliated with "Gente de Lupe Tapia", aligned with MZ/MF, were observed patrolling near the letras monument in Tacuichamona, Sinaloa.

On 26 December, authorities documented the scene where a body was recovered following a gunfight between two unidentified armed groups in the town of Costa Rica, Culiacán municipality, Sinaloa.

On 28 December, a burned-out truck allegedly belonging to La Mayiza was discovered in Sanalona, Sinaloa, following clashes with La Chapiza reported to have occurred several nights earlier.

On 31 December, a member of Los Rusos, aligned with the MZ/MF faction, was observed in El Salado, Sinaloa. On the same day, two bodies wrapped in blankets were left in front of a Ranchito Roll Sushi restaurant that had been shot up in Culiacán, Sinaloa.

==== 2025 ====
On 4 January 2025, a burned-out vehicle was documented following heavy fighting between La Chapiza and La Mayiza in El Espinal, Sinaloa.

On 6 January 2025, two bodies reportedly belonging to the Rugrats, an MF-aligned group, were left with narcomessages beside the letras monument in Costa Rica, Sinaloa, with Los Chapitos believed to be responsible. On the same date, video footage showed Chapitos members firing on a vehicle carrying presumed MZ/MF members outside Costa Rica, Sinaloa.

On 8 January 2025, a convoy of MF/MZ-affiliated gunmen was recorded on the Cosalá–Elota highway near El Solito, Sinaloa. On the same date, armed men alleged to belong to Grupo Flechas, aligned with MF, were observed entering El Palmito, Sinaloa.

On 11 January 2025, video footage circulated showing alleged Chapitos members displaying equipment they claimed had been abandoned by Mayitos following fighting in El Castillo, Sinaloa.

On 12 January 2025, Chapitos-affiliated gunmen were filmed patrolling the streets at night in La Cruz, Sinaloa.

On 13 January 2025, aftermath footage released by MZ/MF-aligned forces documented fighting believed to have occurred outside El Coacoyol, Sinaloa.

On 19 January 2025, Mexican authorities presented Juan Carlos Félix Gastélum ("Chavo Félix") at Base Aérea Militar No. 10 in Culiacán, following his detention the previous day in Quilá, Sinaloa.

On 20 January 2025, an undated video surfaced showing a group of MZ/MF-affiliated gunmen meeting approximately 20 kilometers northeast of La Cruz, Sinaloa, reportedly challenging Chapitos forces to engage.

On 23 January 2025, video footage reportedly filmed by CJNG showed armed operatives active in Acaponeta, Nayarit. On the same date, Grupo Flechas, aligned with the Mayitos, were reported to have captured CJNG members in Villanueva, Zacatecas.

On 26 January 2025, a CJNG convoy was observed operating near Villanueva, Zacatecas.

On 31 January 2025, video footage showed clashes between La Chapiza and La Mayiza in El Palmito, Sinaloa.

On 8 February 2025, authorities displayed Mauro N. ("El Jando") at Base Aérea Militar No. 10 in Culiacán, following his capture.

On 14 February 2025, fighting between La Chapiza and La Mayiza was reported in Culiacán, Sinaloa.

On 18 February 2025, vehicles belonging to Los Cabreras, aligned with the MZ faction, were recorded traveling on the federal free highway in Pueblo Nuevo, Durango.

On 19 February 2025, José Ángel Cannobio Inzunza ("El Güerito"), a senior Los Chapitos figure, was filmed being loaded onto an aircraft at Base Aérea Militar No. 10 in Culiacán following his capture.

On 26 February 2025, video footage documented heavy fighting between MZ/MF and Los Chapitos in Concordia Municipality, Sinaloa. On the same date, clashes were reported between MZ/MF forces and CJNG in Zonteco, Nayarit, as MZ-aligned units advanced toward Huajicori after battles in San Andrés Milpillas in the past months.

On 3 March 2025, the body of an alleged Chapitos member was found hanging from arches in Potrerillos del Norote, Sinaloa, following clashes over territorial control.

On 6 March 2025, two bodies were left outside the STASAC facility in Culiacán, Sinaloa, one of which was wrapped in plastic.

On 14 March 2025, gunmen from the Los Metros faction of the Gulf Cartel were observed operating armored vehicles in Zacatecas, reportedly in support of CJNG.

On 15 March 2025, a Chapitos convoy was recorded entering the town of Tanques, Sinaloa.

On 19 March 2025, an MF-aligned convoy was observed operating along the border of the Cosalá and San Ignacio municipalities in southern Sinaloa.

On 20 March 2025, a Chapitos convoy was documented moving through central Tanques, Sinaloa.

On 23 March 2025, drone footage released by a Chapitos operator showed fighting against Mayiza forces in Potrerillo del Norote, Sinaloa.

On 24 March 2025, the severed head, hands, and feet of "Koki Cázares", identified as a Chapitos affiliate, were left with a narcomanta by La Mayiza near Plaza Fórum in Culiacán, Sinaloa.

On 7 April 2025, an attack on a rehabilitation center in the Colinas de San Miguel area of Culiacán left nine people dead and five injured, with Mexican authorities attributing responsibility to Los Chapitos.

On 15 April 2025, authorities documented the aftermath of a shootout between armed civilians and Mexican security forces in the Los Huizaches area of Culiacán, in which one municipal police officer was reported killed.

On 29 April 2025, a large Chapitos convoy was recorded near El Coacoyol, Sinaloa.

On June 30, authorities discovered four decapitated bodies hanging from a bridge and sixteen more bodies in a white van near Culiacán, Sinaloa, during a surge of cartel violence.

On 9–10 July, clashes between the New Juárez Cartel and Los Cabrera, an armed faction aligned with La Mayiza, resulted in at least 23 fatalities. The violence occurred in the Ojinaga region of Chihuahua, an area that has been contested by the two groups since the previous year.

=== Entry of the Guasave Cartel and territorial realignment (May 2025) ===
Early May 2025, the Guasave Cartel, a faction of the Beltrán Leyva Organization led by Fausto Isidro Meza Flores (“Chapo Isidro”), abandoned its previous neutral stance. Armed clashes were reported in Mocorito and Guamúchil, and the BLO formally aligned with the MZ/MF faction.

On 4 May 2025, federal and state forces detained six heavily armed hitmen in Navolato, Sinaloa.

On 5 May 2025, fighting occurred in Mocorito, Sinaloa between Numerada (Chapitos) and forces aligned with Chapo Isidro, although reports of the participants remained unconfirmed.

On 6 May 2025, armed men belonging to "Gente Del Guano" seen patrolling in Badiraguato, Sinaloa.

On 7 May 2025, a family traveling on Federal Highway 24 near La Lapara and Los Naranjos was caught in the crossfire during an attack on personnel accompanying the Prosecutor's Office and a funeral home. Two girls were killed, and three individuals, including a 12-year-old, were injured. On the same day, an La Linea convoy, reportedly members of the “H’s” faction, was observed in Maguarichi, Chihuahua.

On 8 May 2025, clashes continued in Mocorito and Guamúchil, Sinaloa. A caravan of armored trucks, some with dual rear wheels, was observed in the region.

On 9 May 2025, multiple properties associated with Texas 01 of Los Chapitos were attacked in Badiraguato, Sinaloa.

On 10 May 2025, a threatening message was reportedly left by Chapo Isidro's faction for "Gente del 27" (armed faction under "El Perris") of Los Chapitos in Caimanero, Mocorito, Sinaloa. On the same day, members of "La Gente Del Yuko" were observed patrolling Chinitos, and Angostura, Sinaloa.

Mid to late May 2025, large areas of northern Sinaloa came under the control of the BLO–MZ/MF alliance, while Los Chapitos experienced what was described as a near-collapse of their northern front.

On 18 May 2025, a technical truck marked by Chapo Isidro's faction was documented in La Apoma, Badiraguato, Sinaloa, alongside photographs of a business sprayed with "Musico 23" in Badiraguato.

On 19 May 2025, MZ/MF had reportedly taken control of Surutato, Los Sitios, La Apoma, and several surrounding ranches in Sinaloa.

On 23 May 2025, a raid by Mexican army tried to arrest Jorge Humberto Figueroa Benítez also known as El Perris, but the sudden shootout between cartel members and army resulted in the death of him, he had a bounty of $1 million placed by the US government.

On 26 May 2025, members of "Los Rusos", aligned with the MZ/MF, entered the town of El Pozo, Sinaloa, previously controlled by Los Chapitos. Footage shows them approaching and subsequently burning the house of "El Gini", a lieutenant of Iván Archivaldo Guzmán.

On 27 May 2025, clashes occurred in Aldama–Ojinaga, Chihuahua, between "Los Cabrera" of MZ/MF and La Línea, as MZ/MF attempted to advance in the area. On the same day, members of Mayito Flaco documented the aftermath of these confrontations in Ojinaga, Chihuahua.

On 28 May 2025, members of the MZ/MF faction were filmed in front of the arches of San Tadeo de las Flores, Zacatecas. On the same day, video footage showed "Comandante Tostado 11" of "Grupo Flechas", aligned with "MZ/MF", patrolling around Valparaíso, Zacatecas.

=== Chapitos alliance with CJNG, and transition to a protracted conflict (May 2025 - present) ===
On 31 May 2025, MZ/MF left a body in Culiacán, Sinaloa, with a sign reading: "Here is another Chapozeta lookout… The capital has an owner. They are fighting a lost war… MF. "

On 3 June 2025, Tostado 11 of Grupo Flecha was observed on patrol in Valparaíso, Zacatecas.

On 2 June 2025, a severed human head was left with a narcomensaje near the entrance to the zoo in Culiacán, Sinaloa.

On 4 June 2025, a burning truck was reported following clashes between Los Chapitos and the MZ/MF faction in Mezquitita, Sinaloa.

On 5 June 2025, drone footage captured Chapitos monitoring a MZ/MF blindada in Las Iguanas, Sinaloa.

On 9 June 2025, CJNG and Chapitos members were photographed posing together in front of the letras monument in Cacalótan, Sinaloa, further suggesting an alliance.

On 10 June 2025, graffiti featuring IAG and CJNG appeared on buildings in El Tepuche, Sinaloa, indicating coordination between Chapitos and CJNG. Later in the day, MZ/MF approached the town and began clashing with Chapitos and CJNG, MZ/MF-aligned gunmen later then spray-painted over the graffiti left by Chapitos and CJNG. CJNG fighters were reported in Agua Blanca, Sinaloa, approximately 15 kilometers from Culiacán, indicating operations in coordination with Chapitos.

On 11 June 2025, video footage documented Gente del Guano operating a drone outside Badiraguato, Sinaloa. Aureliano Guzmán Loera (“El Guano”), brother of Joaquín Guzmán Loera (“El Chapo”), was identified as a high-ranking member of the Sinaloa Cartel.

On 15 June 2025, video footage captured "Vitache Special Forces" of Chapo Isidro engaged in combat against "Los Ranas" of Chapitos in the Tierra Blanca neighborhood of Culiacán, Sinaloa. a blindada was left at the scene of a shootout in Culiacán, Sinaloa, where at least two gunmen reportedly died.

On 16 June 2025, a MZ/MF-affiliated sicario was observed standing on the San Luis Potosí side of the state border near Huertecillas, SLP. On 16 June 2025, Los Vitaches and Los Rusos were observed arriving at El Tamarindo, north of Culiacán, Sinaloa, to consolidate control.

On 19 June 2025, a bullet-riddled car involved in a shootout between criminal groups in El Limón de los Ramos, Sinaloa was reported, resulting in two fatalities.

On 20 June 2025, a MZ/MF fighter from Durango, sent by the Cabrera Sarabia brothers to engage the "Nuevo Cártel de Juárez" (NCDJ), was killed and dismembered along a remote stretch of highway.

On 21 June 2025, a video captured a gunfight between Chapitos and MZ/MF sicarios just outside Potrerillo del Norote, Sinaloa.

On 24 June 2025, the Chapiza–CJNG alliance reportedly executed two suspected turncoats from "Los Avendaño". The victims were later displayed hanging from the Benito Juárez highway bridge near Caimanero, Mocorito, Sinaloa.

On 26 June 2025, CJNG fighters were reported in Villanueva, Zacatecas, a contested plaza previously fought over by CJNG and MZ/MF.

On 4 July 2025, dismembered bodies were left on an overpass in San Blas, Sinaloa, with the heads placed on containers and a narcomensaje left at the scene.

On 16 July 2025, MZ/MF sicarios, reportedly from Durango, were observed in Los Humayes, Sinaloa.

On 13 July 2025, MZ/MF sicarios took control of a ranch from Chapitos-affiliated René Bastidas (“El 00”) in San Fermín, Sinaloa.

On 27 July 2025, CJNG sicarios operated in Villanueva, Zacatecas, a town that has been fought over by CJNG and MZ/MF for the past months.

On 31 July 2025, MF/MZ-affiliated "La Gente del Tigre" sicarios patrolled San Juan, Sinaloa, near the letras monument.

On 1 August 2025, a dismembered body was left in a cooler north of Culiacán, Sinaloa, accompanied by a narcomensaje.

On 5 August 2025, MZ/MF sicarios from the Mayito Flaco faction were observed at a crossroads in La Güilota, Nayarit. On the same day, a CJNG convoy patrolled Villanueva, Zacatecas, a key plaza contested between CJNG and MZ/MF.

On 8 August 2025, drone footage showed a reported MZ/MF ranch on fire in Escuinapa, Sinaloa, reportedly attacked with drones by Chapitos.

On 15 August 2025, a convoy of MZ/MF-affiliated sicarios was observed on the road near El Huérfano, Chihuahua, reportedly searching for NCDJ members.

On 15 August 2025, Gente de Guano blockaded the southern entrance to Soyatita on Federal Highway 24, securing access to La Tuna and El Durazno, Sinaloa.

On 18 September 2025, drone footage captured a "Fuerzas Especiales Unión"-affiliated drone observing monstruos and blindadas moving east from La Tuna, Sinaloa.

On 20 September 2025, a large group of MZ/MF-affiliated sicarios was observed approximately 1.5 kilometers from the outskirts of Guachochi, Chihuahua.

On 15 October 2025, GDG–Los Calabazas sicarios were seen in Arroyo Seco, Sinaloa, repainting graffiti over previous Chapitos markings.

On 24 October 2025, ongoing fighting was reported across the Picachos mountain range and the areas of El Carrizal and El Aserradero, located between Huajicori and Acaponeta, Nayarit. The clashes were described as involving MZ/MF aligned forces against the Jalisco New Generation Cartel (CJNG).

On 26 October 2025, a dronero affiliated with Los Músicos / Chapo Isidro reportedly dropped a munition on a Gente del Guano-affiliated vehicle southwest of La Tuna, Sinaloa.

On 7 October 2025, sicarios from the MF/MZ faction patrolled the town of El Salado, Sinaloa, and Chapitos-aligned vehicles were reported in El Rosario, Sinaloa.

On 13 October 2025, an undated video showed an MZ/MF patrol operating on a highway near Villa Juárez, Sinaloa, a known Chapitos stronghold.

On 30 October 2025, infantry units of the Jalisco New Generation Cartel were reported guarding the plaza in Santa María de Picachos a locality within the municipality of Huajicori, Nayarit, indicating an active CJNG presence in the area.

On 9 September 2025, MF/MF-affiliated Grupo Flechas sicarios were documented on the streets of Pánuco, Sinaloa.

On 18 November 2025, clashes were reported in the vicinity of the area known as Ojo de Agua, located a short distance from the municipal seat of Huajicori, Nayarit.

On 2 December 2025, 11 members of "Los Cabreras" of MZ/MF were arrested by the Mexican military in El Pueblito, Chihuahua.

On 7 December 2025, a contingent of MZ/MF fighters was observed operating in Acaponeta, Nayarit.

On 12 December 2025, drone footage captured a Chapitos drone monitoring the movement of MZ/MF sicarios in Casa Viejas, Sinaloa.

On 17 December 2025, intense clashes were reported in Escuinapa, Sinaloa, between rival armed groups, likely involving Fuerzas Especiales Unión (FEU)—CJNG and Los Chapitos—against forces of "Grupo Flechas" of Mayito Flaco (MZ/MF). Residents reported gunfire, road blockades along the Tepic–Mazatlán highway, and the presence of drones, including footage showing a drone carrying an explosive device. Additional drone sightings were reported near the Acaponeta toll booth and on the road connecting Acaponeta to El Rosario.

On 21 December 2025, Óscar Noé Medina González, also known as "El Panu", head of security for Los Chapitos, was assassinated in a targeted attack at the Luaú restaurant in the Zona Rosa of Mexico City. Medina González had arrived in the capital on 19 December 2025 from Mazatlán, Sinaloa, where he rented Airbnb accommodations for himself and his mother in order to spend the Christmas holidays with family. On the day of the attack, he took his mother to church before dining at the restaurant, where two armed assailants entered and one opened fire at close range, striking him at least twelve times. The attacker fled on foot toward Paseo de la Reforma, escaped on a motorcycle, and was captured on security cameras entering and leaving the area. At the scene, authorities recovered 9 mm shell casings and a magazine, and the Secretaría de Seguridad Ciudadana (SSC) and the Fiscalía General de Justicia de la Ciudad de México (FGJCDMX) initiated an investigation. In the immediate aftermath, Medina González’s wife initially misidentified him as "Óscar Ruiz", describing him as a hotel businessman from Mazatlán and removing his belongings before authorities arrived, delaying identification. His identity was later confirmed by his mother, Guadalupe González, who formally identified him to authorities while denying knowledge of his criminal activities.

On 23 December 2025, elements of the Secretariat of Security and Citizen Protection (SSPC), in a joint operation with the Attorney General’s Office (FGR) and the Mexican Army, arrested Mario Alfredo Lindoro Navidad, "El 7", brother-in-law and financial operator of Iván Archivaldo Guzmán Salazar, along with Mario Lindoro Elenes, "El Niño", father-in-law and also a financial operator for the Los Chapitos faction, during coordinated raids in the Bajío Zapopan and Vallarta Universidad neighborhoods of Zapopan, Jalisco. The arrests followed intelligence-led investigations that resulted in two search warrants authorized by a control judge. Authorities seized seven bags of drugs, four handguns, ammunition, magazines, two pickup trucks, a high-end vehicle, a motorcycle, communication equipment, and cash.

==== 2026 ====
On 12 March 2026, the security secretary of the state of Sinaloa resigns due to the War in Sinaloa.

On 19 March, a raid kills 11 members of the Sinaloa Cartel in El Álamo, Sinaloa, with a senior cartel leader being captured along with many weapons.

== Impact ==
=== Forced displacement ===
As violence linked to cartel infighting escalated in Sinaloa, forced displacement increased significantly beginning in late 2024. According to state authorities, at least 1,763 families have been displaced due to insecurity, primarily in mountainous and rural areas of the state. Media reporting indicated that at least 50 rural communities were left largely abandoned, often described as ghost towns, as residents fled ongoing violence.

The municipality of Concordia recorded the highest number of displaced families, with 261 families assisted by mid-2025, followed by Cosalá, where 238 families were reported displaced. Other affected municipalities included Culiacán, Rosario, Elota, San Ignacio, and Navolato. In September 2024, the community of El Palmito in Concordia was evacuated following armed clashes between rival criminal groups, displacing approximately 180–200 residents and effectively rendering the town uninhabited.

Displaced families relocated primarily to Mazatlán and other municipal centers in southern Sinaloa, while others fled toward Durango when highways to Culiacán were blocked by criminal roadblocks. Authorities acknowledged that an undetermined number of families relocated to other Mexican states without registering with local or state agencies, complicating efforts to maintain comprehensive displacement figures.

== Reactions ==
=== Federal government ===
==== López Obrador administration ====
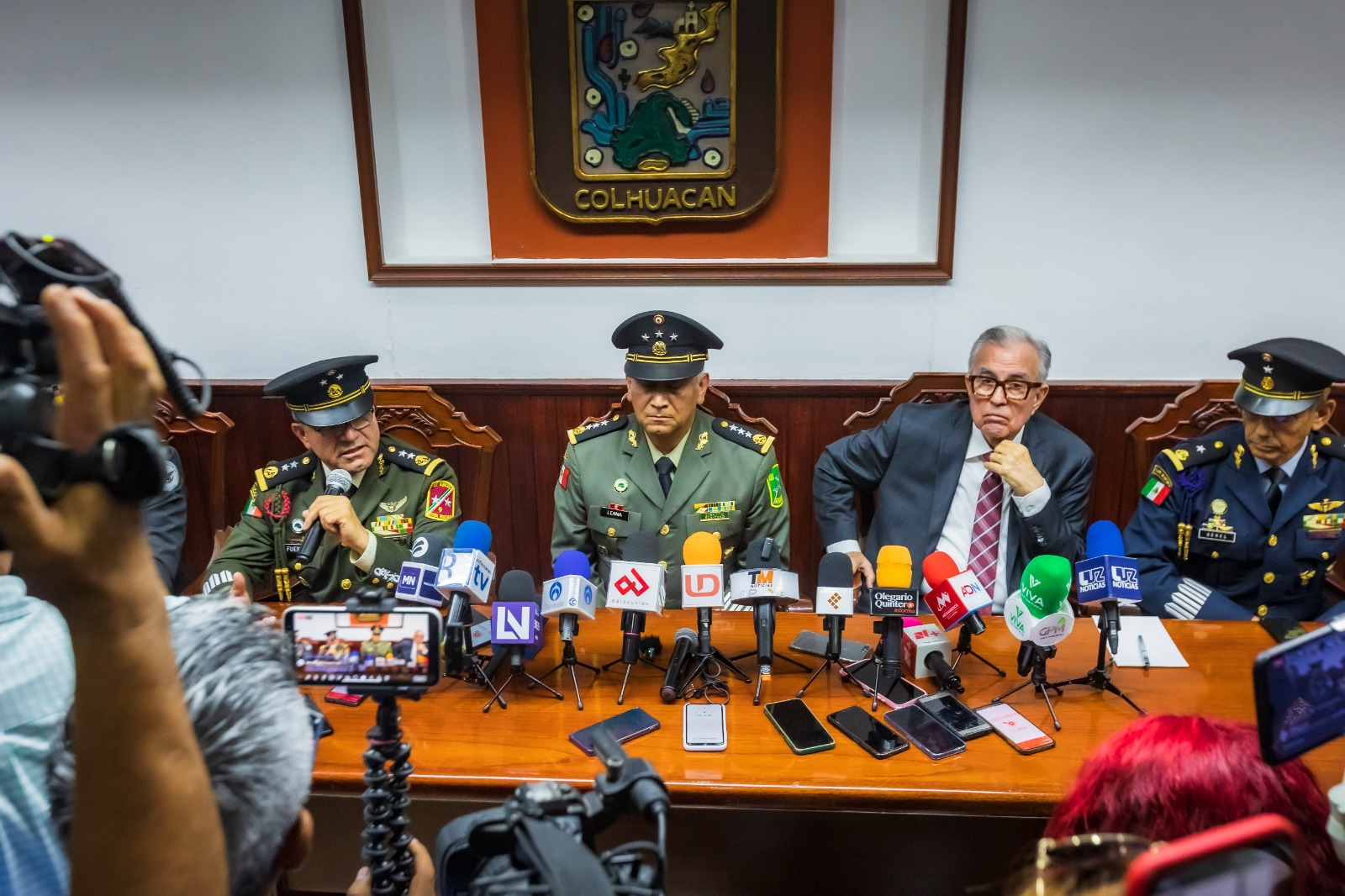
General Jesús Leana Ojeda (center) and Governor of Sinaloa Rubén Rocha Moya (right) during a press conference addressing the violence on 16 September 2024.

López Obrador frequently downplayed reports of escalating violence, claiming that coverage was exaggerated by conservative media outlets. He explicitly blamed the U.S. government for the violence in Sinaloa, attributing the instability to the agreement between the United States and Joaquín Guzmán López that resulted in the arrest of Ismael "El Mayo" Zambada and suggesting it provoked the outbreak of violence. Speaking at a morning press conference, he called on rival criminal groups to act responsibly and avoid harming civilians, and stated that his administration would continue to prioritize the protection of the population.

On 16 September, General Jesús Leana Ojeda, commander of the Third Military Region, asserted that state security did not depend solely on the army but on the rival groups' willingness to stop their confrontations.

== See also ==
- Infighting in the Gulf Cartel – internal conflict within the Gulf Cartel involving two factions of the Gulf Cartel, Los Metros and Los Rojos
- Infighting in Los Zetas – internal conflict within the Los Zetas Cartel that was responsible for the creation of the Cártel del Noreste
- Los Ninis – armed wing of the Sinaloa Cartel's Los Chapitos
