= Yeraldine Bonilla Valverde =

Interim governor of Sinaloa

Secretary of Government of the State of Sinaloa
- In office 21 August 2026 – 4 November 2026
- Governor: Rubén Rocha Moya; Graciela Domínguez Nava
- Preceded by: Pablo Francisco Bedoya (acting)
- Succeeded by: César Julio Saucedo
- In office 24 October 2025 – 2 May 2026
- Governor: Rubén Rocha Moya
- Preceded by: Rodolfo Jiménez López
- Succeeded by: Pablo Francisco Bedoya (acting)

Governor of Sinaloa
- Interim
- In office 2 May 2026 – 21 August 2026
- Preceded by: Rubén Rocha Moya
- Succeeded by: Rubén Rocha Moya

Member of the Congress of Sinaloa
- In office 1 October 2018 – 31 September 2021
- Constituency: Proportional representation

Personal details
- Born: October 29, 1992 (age 34) San Ignacio, Sinaloa, Mexico
- Party: National Regeneration Movement (since 2018)
- Education: Autonomous University of Sinaloa
- Occupation: Politician

Yeraldine Bonilla Valverde (born 29 October 1992) is a Mexican politician who serves as Secretary of Government of the State of Sinaloa, having previously served as interim Governor of Sinaloa, after Rubén Rocha Moya requested a leave of absence from May to August 2026. She previously served as General Secretary of the Government of Sinaloa from October 2025 until May 2026.

== Biography ==
She studied for a bachelor's degree in social work at the Autonomous University of Sinaloa. She was a deputy of the LXIII Legislature of the Congress of the State of Sinaloa.

In the area of public safety, she also served as acting head of the Sinaloa State Public Security Secretariat, a role she temporarily held from 25 August to 6 September 2023.

On 24 October 2025, she was appointed as Secretary of Government of the State of Sinaloa by Governor Rubén Rocha Moya. Following Rocha Moya's leave on 1 May 2026, Bonilla Valverde was designated as interim governor by the Congress of Sinaloa.

On 21 August 2026, she returned to the office of Secretary of Government of Sinaloa after Rocha Moya, returned to his post as Governor, but resigned on 4 November 2026.
