= Carnaval de Mazatlán =

Carnival in Mazatlán

Carnival of Mazatlán Carnaval de Mazatlán
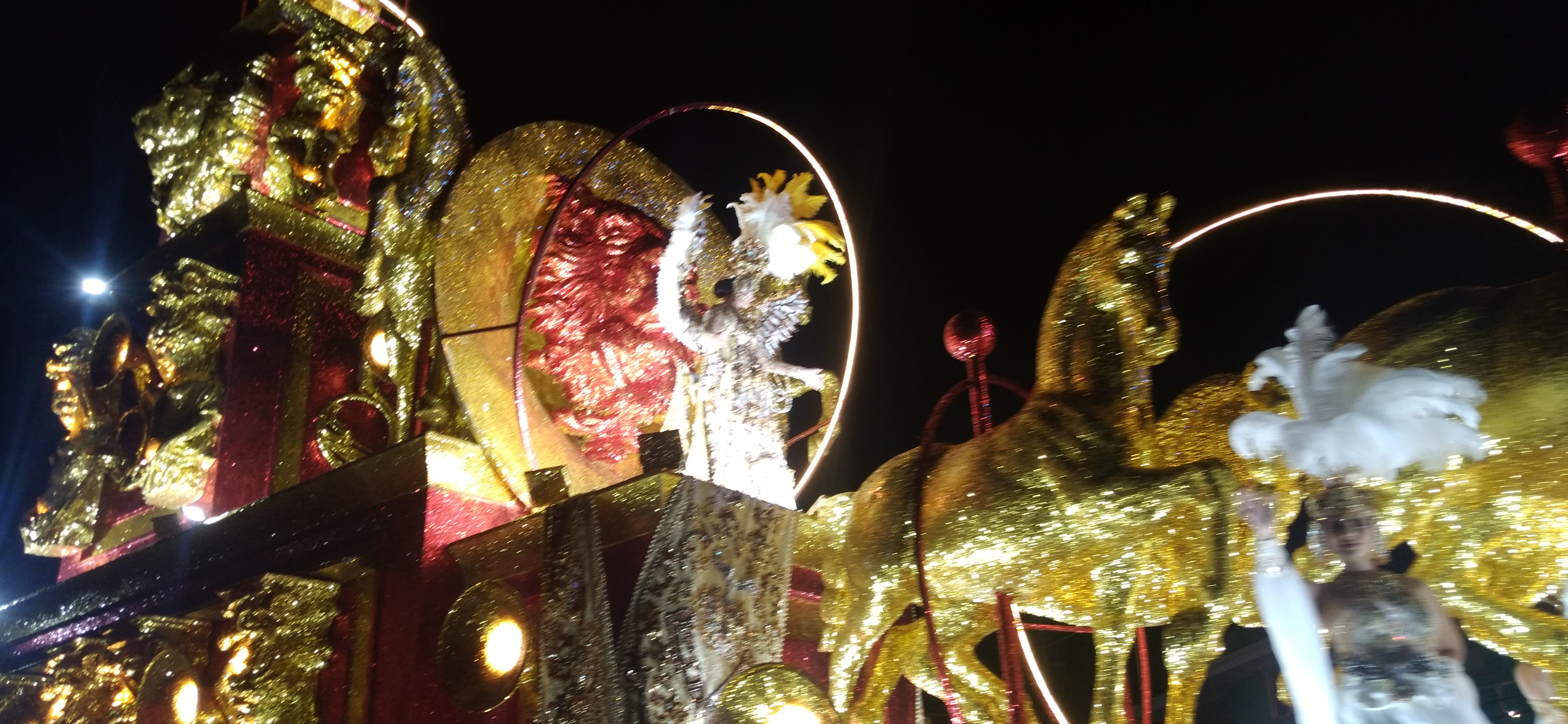
- The carnival in 2026
- Status: Active
- Genre: Carnival
- Frequency: Annually
- Location: Mazatlán
- Country: Mexico
- Years active: 1898-present
- Inaugurated: 1898
- Most recent: 2026
- Website: carnavalmazatlan.com

The Carnaval de Mazatlán is an annual carnival held in the Mexican city of Mazatlán, Sinaloa. It is celebrated the five days before Ash Wednesday.

== History ==
The carnival consists of various cultural events, such as float parades, fireworks, dances and poetry contests, literature awards and shows of enormous artistic quality. It was first staged in 1898.

The carnival has been canceled several times over the years:

- In 1903, as a preventive measure for the bubonic plague
- In 1906, due to lack of financial resources
- In 1912, due to a smallpox epidemic.
- In 1915 and 1916, due to the Mexican Revolution
- In 1944, it was partially canceled due to the assassination of Governor of Sinaloa Rodolfo T. Loaiza.
- In 2010, during the Carnival Tuesday parade, a rumor spread quickly that "there were gunshots," resulting in several people fainting, beaten, and children lost. This caused the suspension of the parade and the events of that last day of the carnival.
- In 2021, due to COVID-19.

== Gallery ==
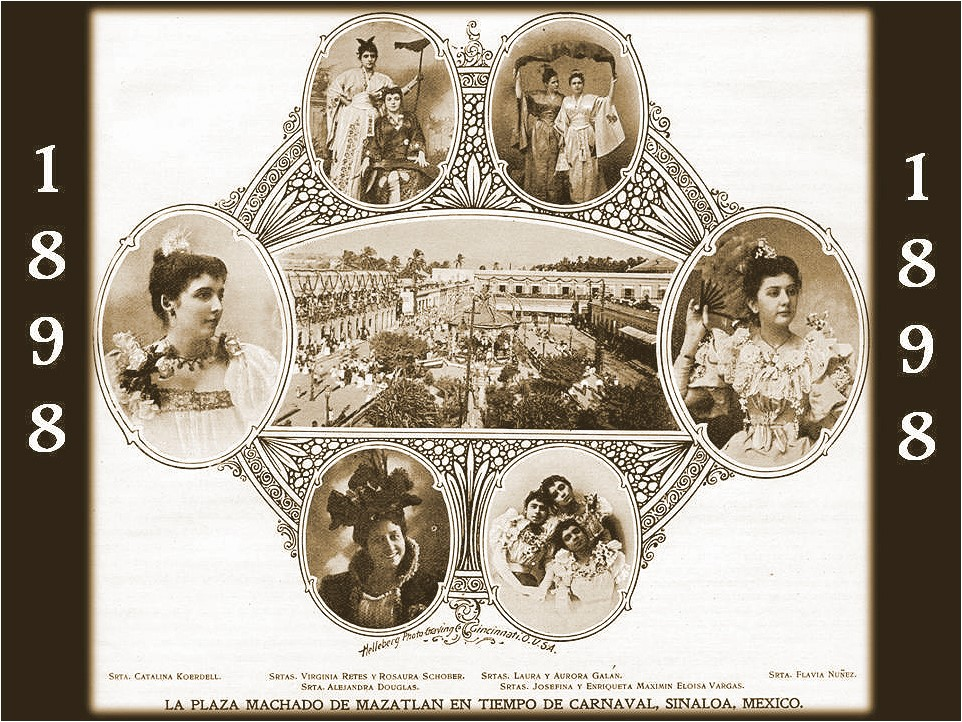
The carnival in 1898

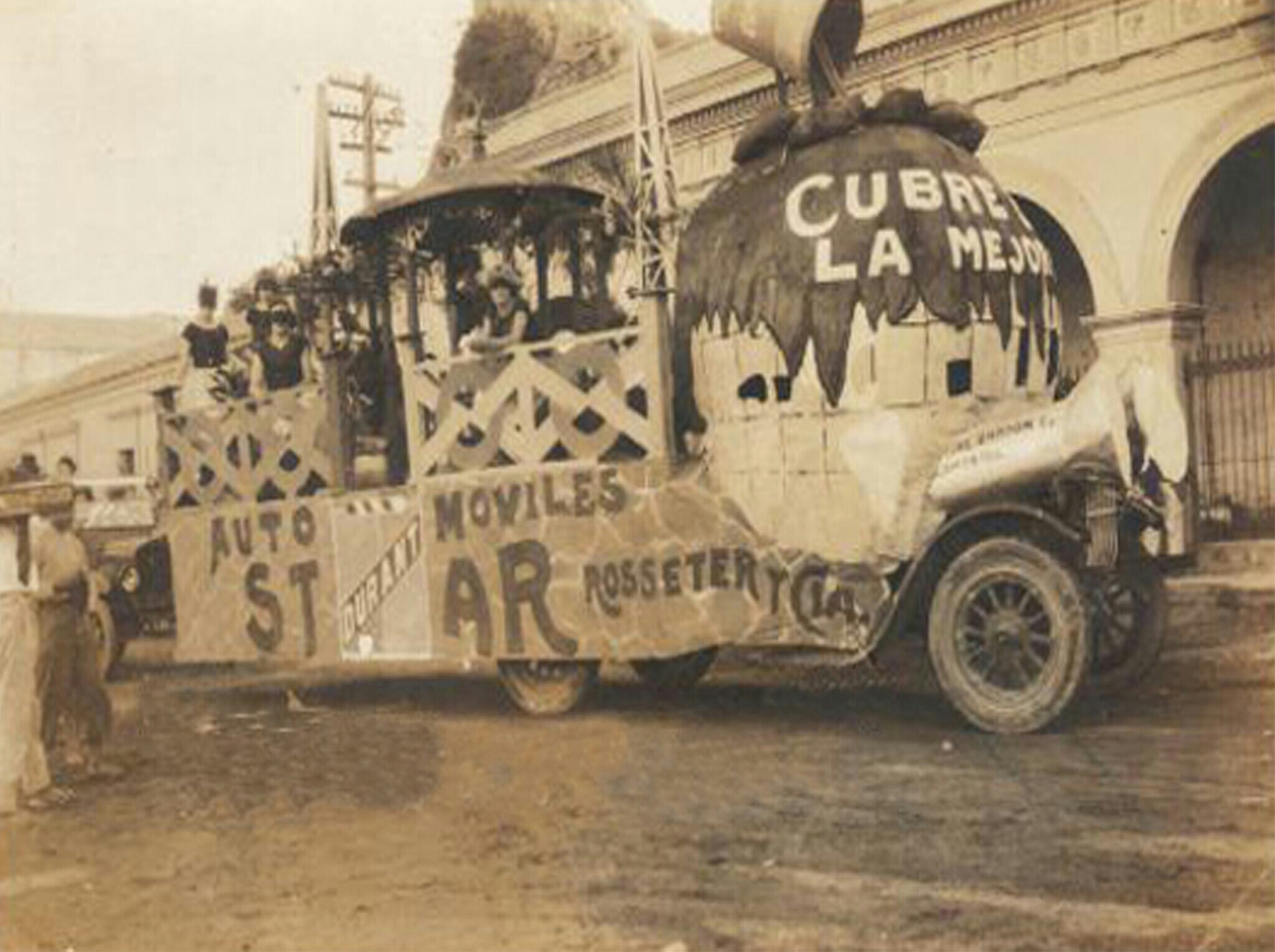
The carnival in 1924

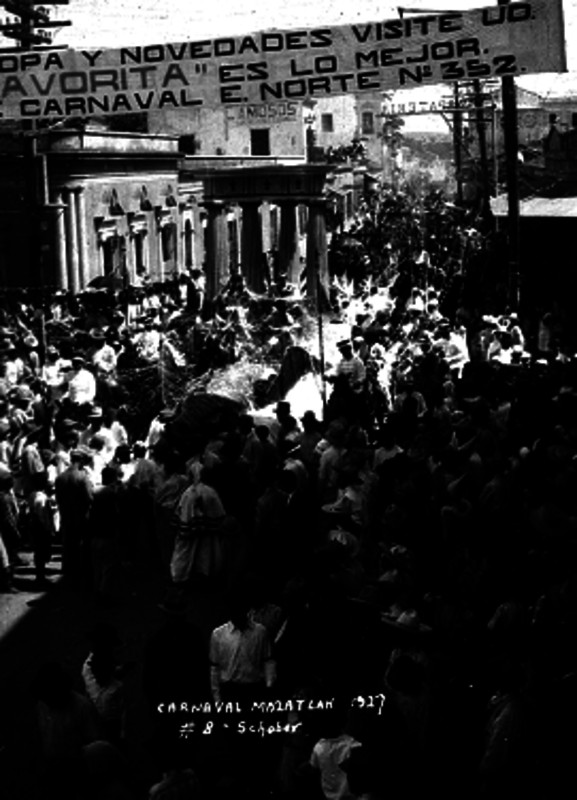
The carnival in 1927

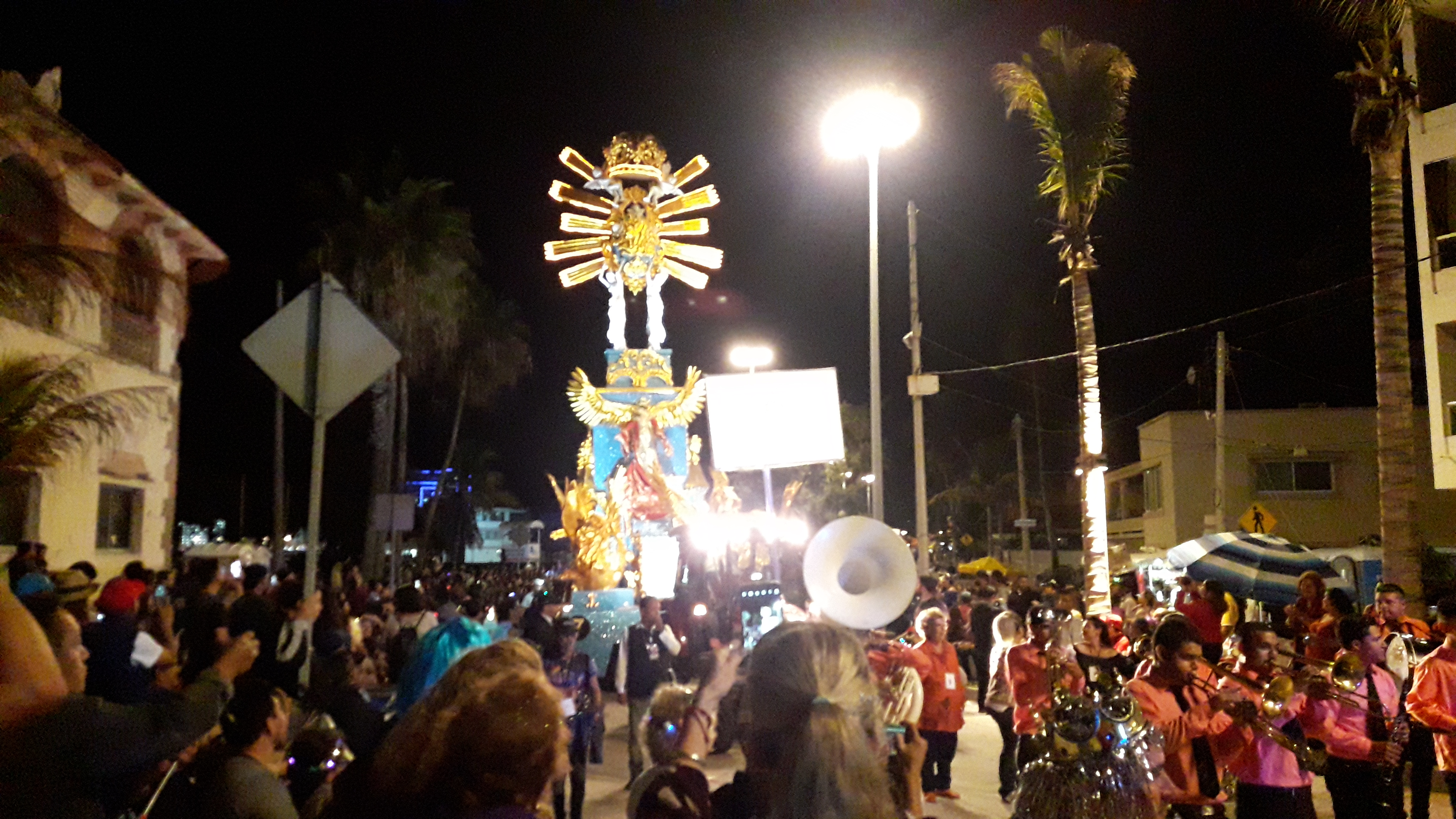
The carnival in 2019

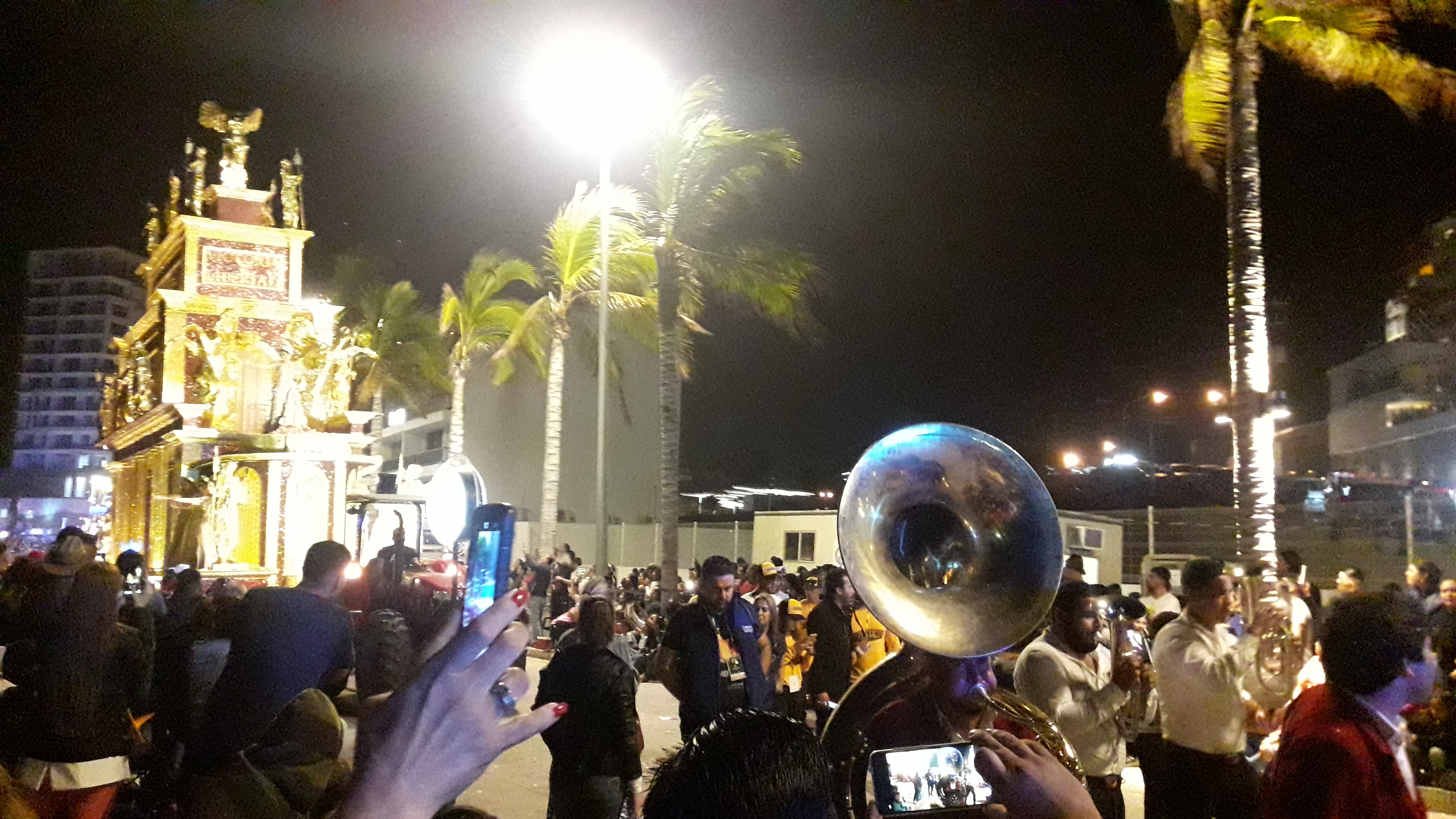
The carnival in 2020

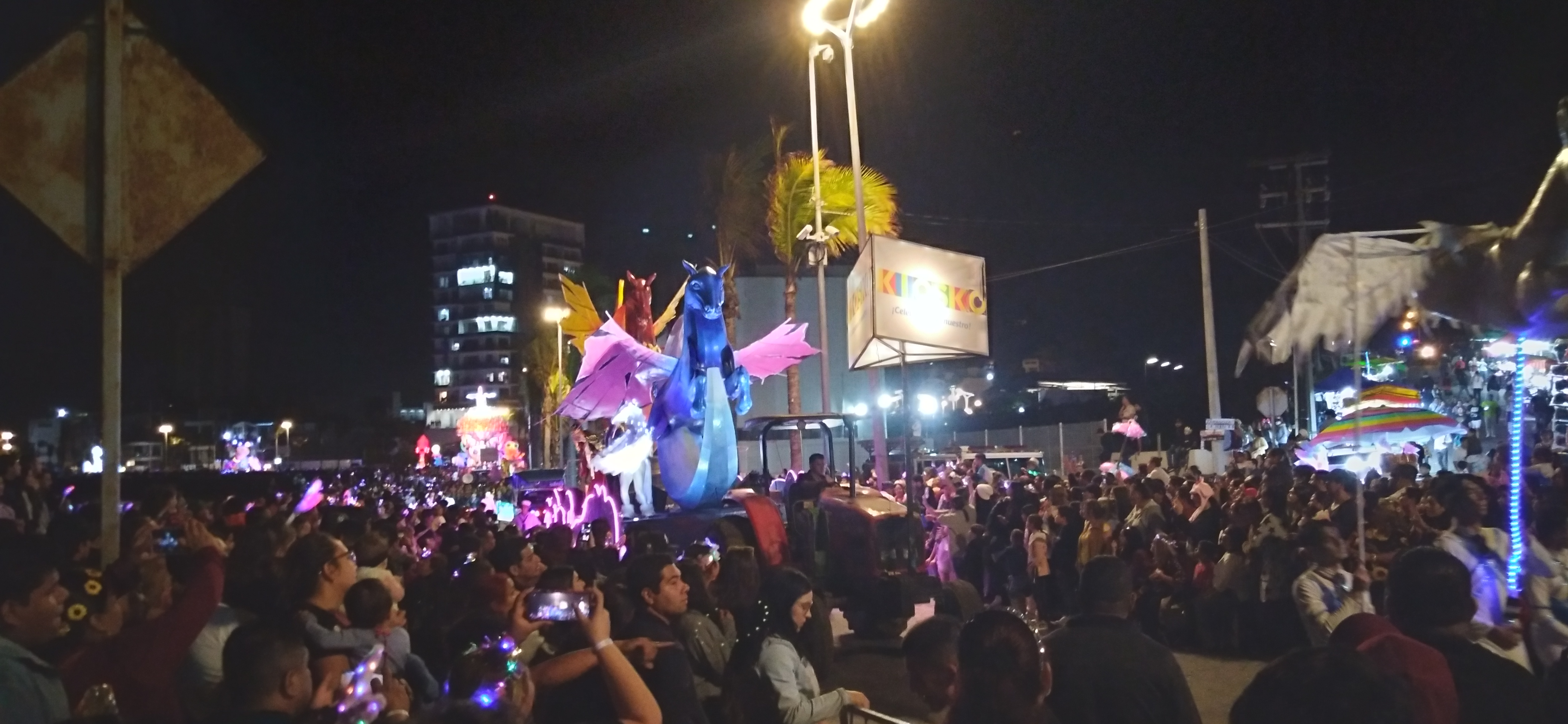
The carnival in 2023

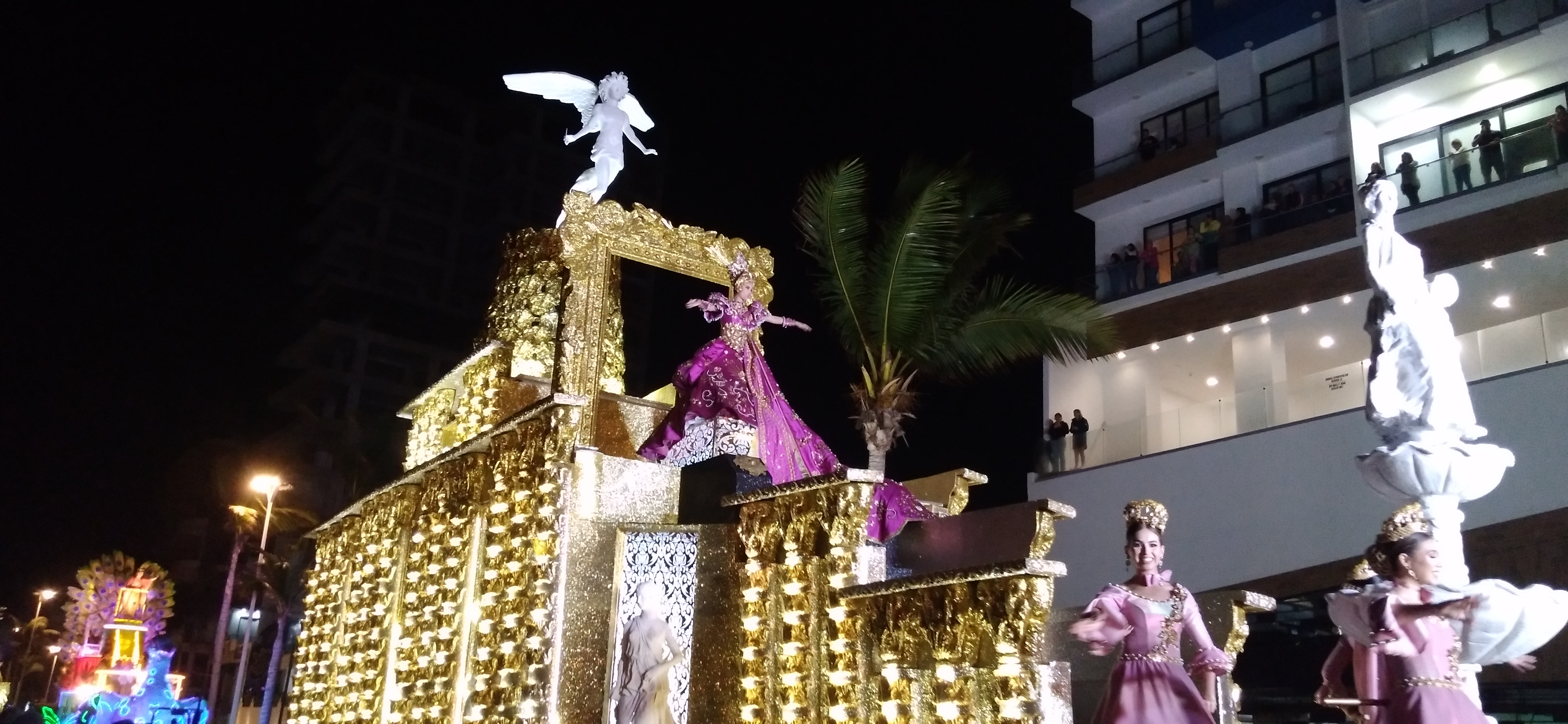
The carnival in 2024

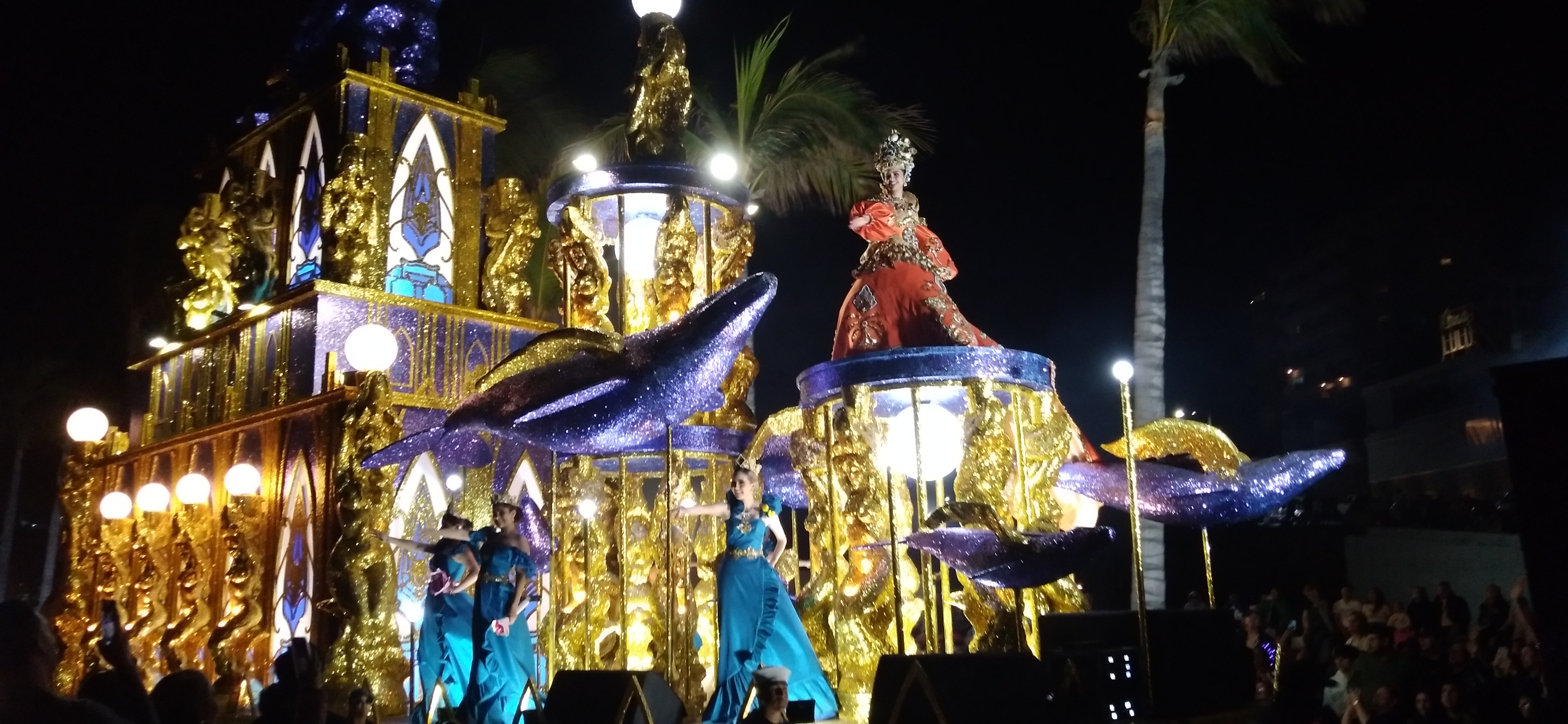
The carnival in 2025
