= Francisco Frías Castro =

Mexican lawyer and politician

- Born: 1 September 1950 (age 75); Los Mochis, Sinaloa, Mexico
- Education: Autonomous University of Sinaloa
- Occupations: Lawyer and politician
- Political party: PRI

Francisco Cuauhtémoc Frías Castro (born 1 September 1950) is a Mexican lawyer and politician affiliated with the Institutional Revolutionary Party (PRI). In the 2003 mid-terms he was elected to the Chamber of Deputies to represent Sinaloa's 1st district during the 59th session of Congress. He had previously served as a local deputy in the LVI Legislature of the Congress of Sinaloa.
