= Oscar Salazar =

Oscar Salazar may refer to:

- Oscar Salazar (baseball) (born 1978), Major League Baseball infielder
- Óscar Salazar (taekwondo) (born 1977), practitioner of taekwondo
- Óscar Lara Salazar (born 1962), Mexican politician
