= 1st federal electoral district of Sinaloa =

Federal electoral district of Mexico

Sinaloa's 1st
- Electoral district of the Chamber of Deputies of Mexico

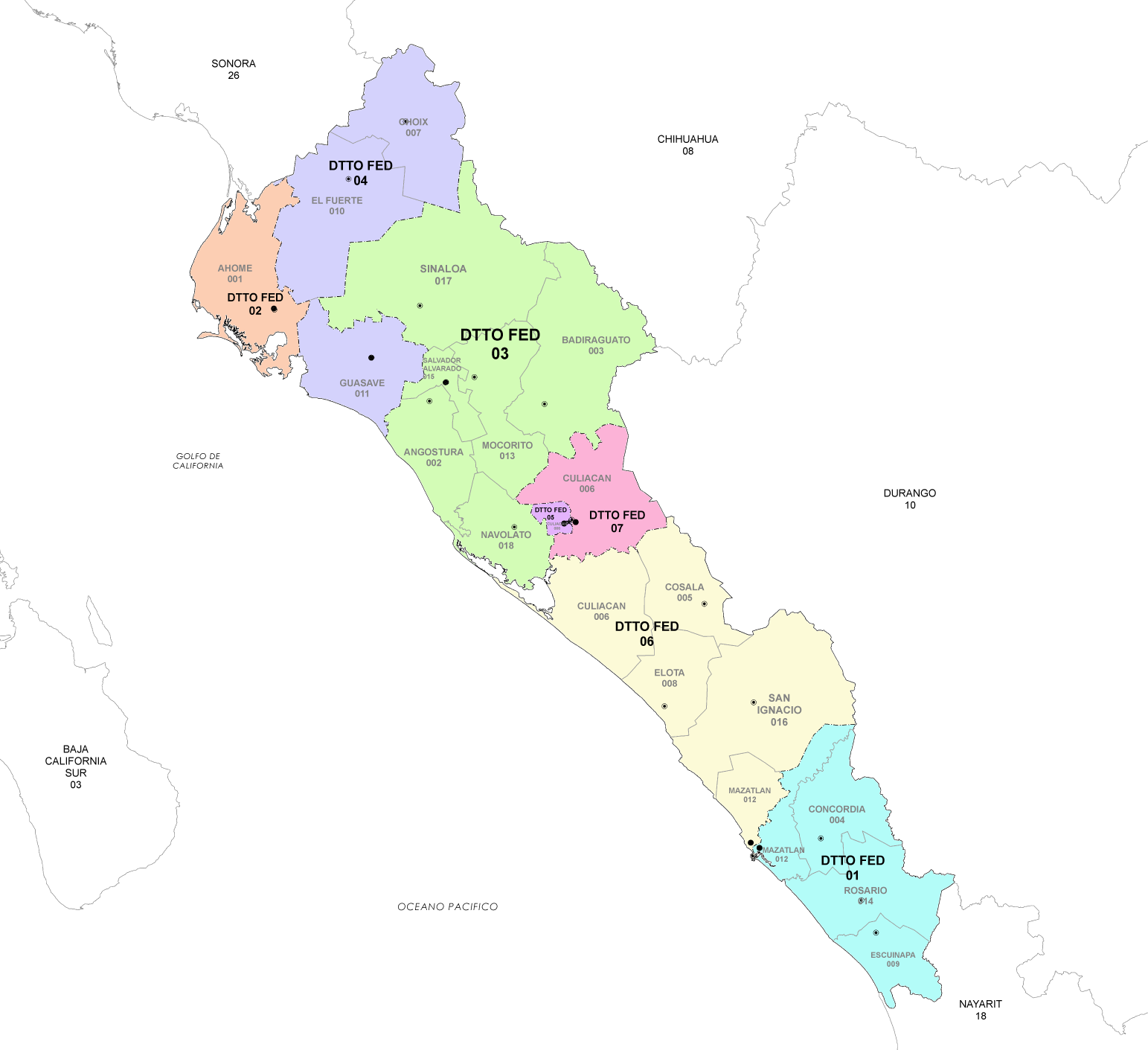
- 1st district since 2023

Incumbent
- Member: Graciela Domínguez Nava
- Party: ▌Morena
- Congress: 66th (2024–2027)

District
- State: Sinaloa
- Head town: Mazatlán
- Coordinates: 23°13′N 106°25′W
- Covers: Concordia, Escuinapa, Mazatlán (part), Rosario
- PR region: First
- Precincts: 468
- Population: 425,184 (2020 census)

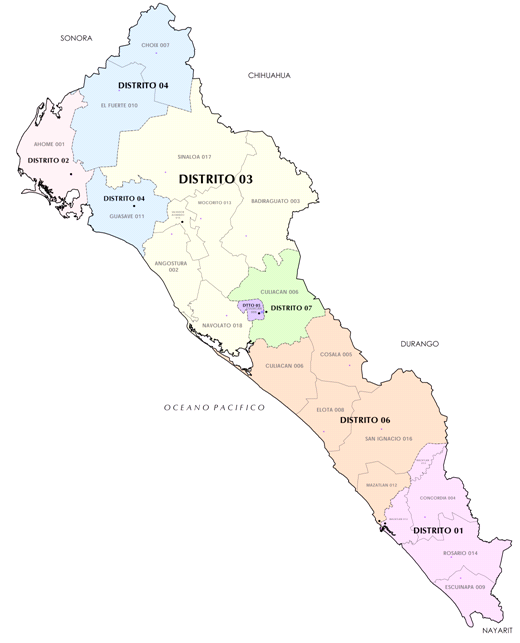
Sinaloa under the 2017–2022 districting scheme

The 1st federal electoral district of Sinaloa (Spanish: Distrito electoral federal 01 de Sinaloa) is one of the 300 electoral districts into which Mexico is divided for elections to the federal Chamber of Deputies and one of seven such districts in the state of Sinaloa.

It elects one deputy to the lower house of Congress for each three-year legislative session by means of the first-past-the-post system. Votes cast in the district also count towards the calculation of proportional representation ("plurinominal") deputies elected from the first region.

The current member for the district, elected in the 2024 general election, is Graciela Domínguez Nava of the National Regeneration Movement (Morena).

== District territory ==
Under the 2023 districting plan adopted by the National Electoral Institute (INE), which is to be used for the 2024, 2027 and 2030 federal elections, the first district covers 468 electoral precincts (secciones electorales) across four municipalities in the extreme south of the state:

- Concordia, Escuinapa and Rosario in their entirety, and 273 precincts in the southern and eastern portions of Mazatlán. (Note: The remainder of the municipality of Mazatlán is assigned to the 6th district.)

The head town (cabecera distrital), where results from individual polling stations are gathered together and tallied, is the port city of Mazatlán. The district reported a population of 425,184 in the 2020 census.

== Previous districting schemes ==
Evolution of electoral district numbers
	1974	1978	1996	2005	2017	2023
Sinaloa	5	9	8	8	7	7
Chamber of Deputies	196	300				

2017–2022

The same four municipalities as in the 2023 plan, but with Mazatlán divided differently (only 271 precincts assigned to the district). The head town was at Mazatlán.

2005–2017

The municipalities of Choix, El Fuerte, Sinaloa, Mocorito and Badiraguato in the north of the state. The head town was at El Fuerte.

1996–2005

The municipalities of Choix, El Fuerte, Salvador Alvarado and Sinaloa, with the head town at El Fuerte.

1978–1996

The districting scheme in force from 1978 to 1996 was the result of the 1977 electoral reforms, which increased the number of single-member seats in the Chamber of Deputies from 196 to 300. Under that plan, Sinaloa's seat allocation rose from five to nine. The 1st district was located in the north-west of the state: it covered a part of the municipality of Ahome, including the city of Los Mochis.

== Deputies returned to Congress ==
(Mexico) National parties
- Current
- PAN
- PRI
- PT
- PVEM
- MC
- Morena
- PAZ
- Somos
- Defunct or local only
- PLM
- PNR
- PRM
- PNM
- PP
- PPS
- PARM
- PFCRN
- CON
- PANAL
- PSD
- PES
- PES
- PRD

Sinaloa's 1st district
Election	Deputy	Party	Term	Legislature
1908	Manuel Uruchurtu Ramírez		1908–1910	24th Congress
1910	Manuel Uruchurtu Ramírez		1910–1912	25th Congress
1916	Pedro R. Zavala		1916–1917	Constituent Congress of Querétaro
...
1979	Salvador Esquer Apodaca	Institutional Revolutionary Party	1979–1982	51st Congress
1982	Ángel Sandoval Romero	Institutional Revolutionary Party	1982–1985	52nd Congress
1985	Salvador Esquer Apodaca	Institutional Revolutionary Party	1985–1988	53rd Congress
1988	Ramón Alejo Valdez López	Institutional Revolutionary Party	1988–1991	54th Congress
1991	Jesús Octavio Falomir Hernández	Institutional Revolutionary Party	1991–1994	55th Congress
1994	Alfredo Valdez Gaxiola	Institutional Revolutionary Party	1994–1997	56th Congress
1997	Jesús Higuera Laura	Institutional Revolutionary Party	1997–2000	57th Congress
2000	Fernando Díaz de la Vega	Institutional Revolutionary Party	2000–2003	58th Congress
2003	Francisco Cuauhtémoc Frías Castro	Institutional Revolutionary Party	2003–2006	59th Congress
2006	Mayra Gisela Peñuelas Acuña	Institutional Revolutionary Party	2006–2009	60th Congress
2009	Óscar Lara Salazar	Institutional Revolutionary Party	2009–2012	61st Congress
2012	Román Alfredo Padilla Fierro	Institutional Revolutionary Party	2012–2015	62nd Congress
2015	Gloria Himelda Félix Niebla	Institutional Revolutionary Party	2015–2018	63rd Congress
2018	Maximiliano Ruiz Arias (Note: Ruiz Arias died in office on 25 November 2019 and was replaced by his alternate, Osuna Medina.); José Mario Osuna Medina	National Regeneration Movement Labour Party (Mexico) Institutional Revolutionary Party	2018–2019; 2019–2021	64th Congress
2021	Leobardo Alcántara Martínez	Labour Party (Mexico)	2021–2024	65th Congress
2024	Graciela Domínguez Nava	National Regeneration Movement	2024–2027	66th Congress

== Presidential elections ==
Sinaloa's 1st district
Election	District won by	Party or coalition	%
2018	Andrés Manuel López Obrador	Juntos Haremos Historia	62.8148
2024	Claudia Sheinbaum Pardo	Sigamos Haciendo Historia	73.2033
