= Imelda Castro Castro =

Mexican politician (born 1968)

Senator of the Congress of the Union for Sinaloa
- Incumbent
- Assumed office August 29, 2024 Serving with Enrique Inzunza Cázarez and Paloma Sánchez Ramos
- Preceded by: Raúl Elenes Angulo

Personal details
- Born: 30 November 1968 (age 57) Agua Caliente de Cebada, Sinaloa, Mexico
- Party: Morena
- Other political affiliations: PRD
- Education: Autonomous University of Sinaloa
- Occupation: Politician

Imelda Castro Castro (born November 30, 1968) is a Mexican politician from the National Regeneration Movement (Morena) party. Since September 1, 2018, she is a Senator of the Republic in the LXIV legislature of the Congress of the Union for the state of Sinaloa. Likewise, since September 1, 2020, she has served as Vice President of the Board of Directors of the Senate.

== Early years ==
Imelda Castro Castro was born on November 30, 1968, in the town of Agua Caliente de Cebada, in the municipality of Sinaloa, in the Mexican state of Sinaloa. Since 1991 she has lived in Culiacán. From 1986 to 1991 she studied the bachelor's degree in Political Science and Public Administration at the Autonomous University of Sinaloa and from 1994 to 1997 the master's degree in political science at the Autonomous University of Zacatecas. From 2008 to 2010 she was a columnist for the weekly Ríodoce. She was a professor at the Autonomous University of Sinaloa from 2001 to 2012.

== Political career ==
In 1989 she began her militancy in the Party of the Democratic Revolution (PRD). Within this party she was postulated as a candidate for senator of the Republic in the federal elections of 2000. From 2001 to 2004 she was a deputy in the Congress of Sinaloa, where she was president of the Economic Development Commission. She was the state president of the PRD in Sinaloa from 2005 to 2008. From 2011 to 2013 she was director of agribusiness for the Secretary of Economic Development of Governor Mario López Valdez. From 2013 to 2016 she was again a deputy in the Congress of Sinaloa, being coordinator of the PRD Parliamentary Group. On 29 August 2017, she resigned from the PRD to join the Movimiento Regeneración Nacional party.

=== Senator of the Republic ===
In the 2018 federal elections, she was nominated by the Movimiento Regeneración Nacional (Morena) party as senator in the second formula for the state of Sinaloa. After the elections, she held office in the LXIV Legislature of the Upper House of the Congress of the Union since 1 September 2018. Within the Senate, she is president of the bicameral national security commission and secretary of the commission for the delivery of the Belisario Domínguez Medal. From 2018 to 2019 she was secretary of the social security commission and from 2019 to 2020 she was secretary of the second legislative studies commission. She was vice president of the Senate Board of Directors from August 2010 to August 2021.

Castro Castro won re-election as one of Sinaloa's senators in the 2024 Senate election, occupying the first place on the National Regeneration Movement's two-name formula.

=== Future ===
In 2026, Morena announced her as the "state coordinator for the defense of the transformation and national sovereignty", a position expected to represent the party in the Sinaloa gubernatorial election of 6 June 2027.
