= Jesús Aguilar Padilla =

Mexican politician and lawyer (1952–2023)

Governor of Sinaloa
- In office 1 January 2005 – 31 December 2010
- Preceded by: Juan Sigfrido Millán Lizárraga
- Succeeded by: Mario López Valdez

Personal details
- Born: 24 February 1952 El Llano de la Carrera, Sinaloa, Mexico
- Died: 30 January 2023 (aged 70)
- Party: Institutional Revolutionary Party (PRI)
- Spouse: Juliana Rosalía Camacho Rojas
- Profession: Lawyer

Jesús Alberto Aguilar Padilla (24 February 1952 – 30 January 2023) was a Mexican politician and lawyer from the Institutional Revolutionary Party (PRI). He was Governor of the state of Sinaloa from 2005 until 2010, and was previously a state congressman, he also served various positions in his party and in the state government.

Aguilar Padilla died on 30 January 2023, at the age of 70.

== See also ==
- Governor of Sinaloa
- List of Mexican state governors
