= Fernando Díaz de la Vega =

Mexican politician

- Born: 12 January 1953 (age 73); Guamúchil, Sinaloa, Mexico
- Occupation: Politician
- Political party: PRI

Fernando Díaz de la Vega (born 12 January 1953) is a Mexican lawyer and politician from the Institutional Revolutionary Party (PRI). In the 2000 general election he was elected to the Chamber of Deputies to represent Sinaloa's 1st district during the 58th session of Congress. He had previously served as municipal president of Salvador Alvarado.
