= Quirino Ordaz Coppel =

Mexico lawyer and politician (born 1962)

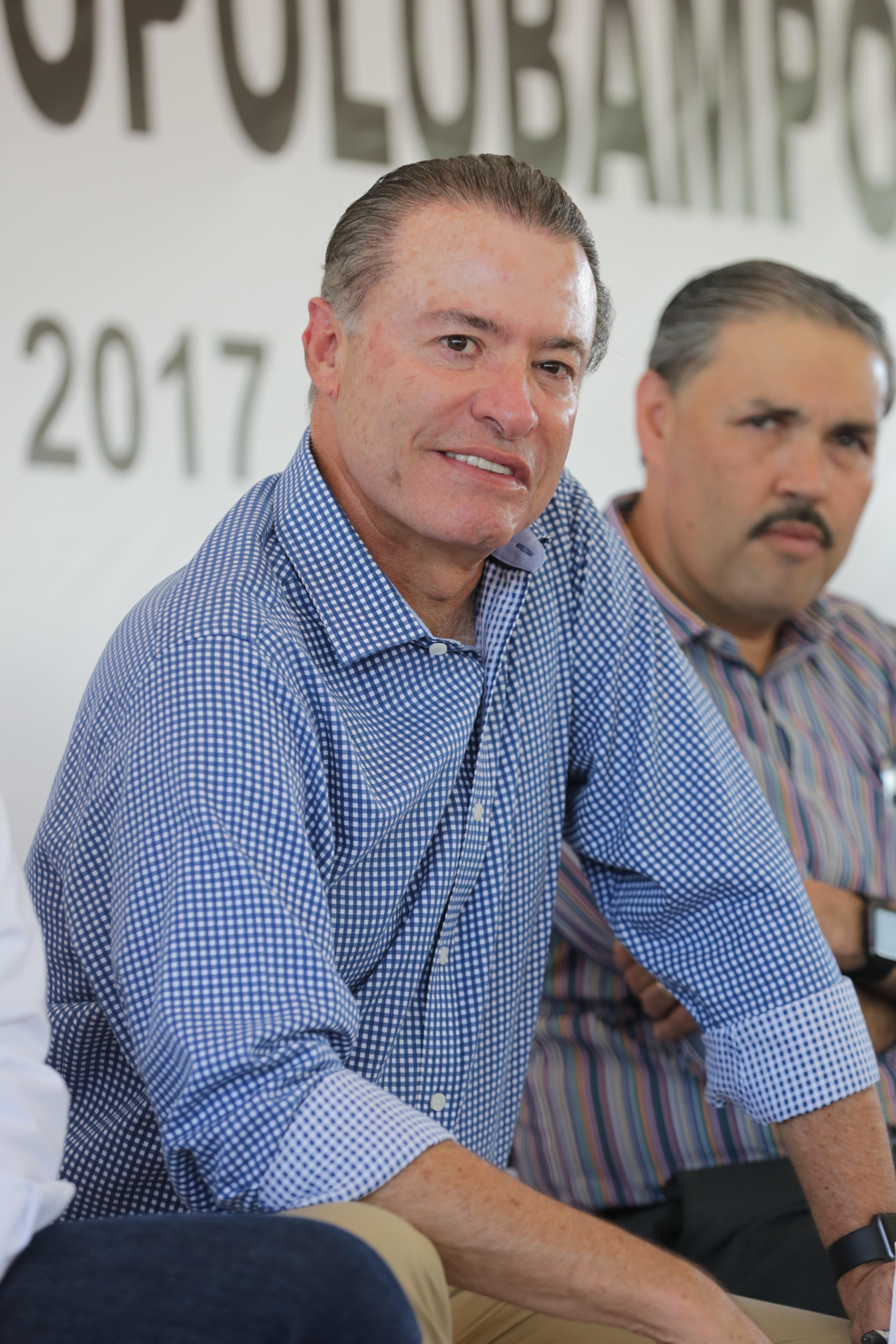

Ambassador to Spain
- Incumbent
- Assumed office January 28, 2022
- Preceded by: Roberta Lajous Vargas

Governor of Sinaloa
- In office January 1, 2017 – October 31, 2021
- Preceded by: Mario López Valdez
- Succeeded by: Rubén Rocha Moya

Member of the Chamber of Deputies
- In office August 29, 2015 – March 1, 2016

Personal details
- Born: October 24, 1962 (age 63) Mazatlán, Sinaloa, Mexico
- Party: Institutional Revolutionary Party
- Spouse: Rosa Isela Fuentes de Ordaz
- Education: Autonomous University of the State of Mexico (LLB); National Institute of Public Administration (MPA)
- Occupation: Lawyer; Politician

Quirino Ordaz Coppel (born October 24, 1962) is a Mexican lawyer and politician affiliated with the Institutional Revolutionary Party (PRI). He served as the Governor of the state of Sinaloa from 2017 to 2021. He previously served as a federal deputy for the eighth federal electoral district of Sinaloa from August 29, 2015, to March 1, 2016.

Ordaz Coppel was elected Governor of Sinaloa in 2016 and took office on January 1, 2017.

== Early life and education ==
Ordaz Coppel was born in Mazatlán, where his father, Quirino Ordaz Luna, was a municipal president between 1984 and 1986. At a young age, Ordaz Coppel and his five siblings lost their mother, Maricarmen Coppel, who was killed in a car accident. He received his undergraduate degree in law from the Universidad Autónoma del Estado de México and his master's degree in public administration from the National Public Administration Institute.

== Political career ==
His political career began in 1985, when he served as an advisor to Governor of the State of Mexico Alfredo Baranda García from 1985 to 1988. From there, Ordaz Coppel became deputy director of coordination and promotion of the Secretary of Energy, Mines and State-Owned Industries. After three years in that office, he performed several tasks for the PRI: he was the financial advisor to Luis Donaldo Colosio's presidential campaign, and he presided over the Fundación Colosio in Mazatlán.

In 1994, Ordaz Coppel returned to government service by becoming the Director General of Social Protection for the Department of the Federal District; three years later, he became the first director general of the National System for Integral Family Development in the nation's capital, though he did not last a full year in the job. From 1998 to 2000, Ordaz Coppel served as the Director General of Promotional Operations for the Secretariat of Tourism, and after that, he spent a year as the deputy director general of promotion for the Mexican Council of Tourism Promotion.

In 2001, Ordaz Coppel became a delegate for Banobras in Sinaloa, which marked his first political position in his home state and a shift in his political career. From 2003 to 2004, he served as the treasurer of Mazatlán, and from 2005 to 2010 he filled administrative positions in the state government, first as the deputy secretary of administration (2005–09) and then as the Secretary of Administration and Finances.

== Legislative career ==
In 2015, the PRI and Ecologist Green Party of Mexico (PVEM) ran Ordaz Coppel for the Chamber of Deputies from Sinaloa's eighth district, which included Mazatlán. Ordaz Coppel won a seat traditionally held by the opposition and was designated as a PVEM deputy in the 63rd Congress. During his time as a deputy, Ordaz Coppel was the secretary of the commissions on Tourism, as well as Drinking Water and Sanitation; he also sat on the Budget and Public Accounts Commission.

=== Gubernatorial election ===
On January 25, 2016, the PRI in Sinaloa unanimously selected Ordaz Coppel as its gubernatorial candidate, later to be joined by the PVEM and Nueva Alianza. In order to run for governor, Ordaz Coppel stepped aside from the Chamber of Deputies and was replaced by José de Jesús Galindo Rosas, his alternate, effective January 27.

In the June 5 elections, Ordaz Coppel and the PRI-PVEM-Nueva Alianza coalition obtained 41.73 percent of the vote and 160,000 more votes than the next closest candidate.

== Diplomatic mission ==
On September 11, 2021, President Andres Manuel López Obrador proposed Ordaz to the post of Ambassador to Spain.

== Business ==
Ordaz Coppel owns the Océano Palace and Luna Palace hotels in Mazatlán, built in 1975 and 1993, respectively.

== Personal life ==
Ordaz Coppel is married to Rosa Isela Fuentes de Ordaz and has two daughters and a son.
