= Graciela Domínguez Nava =

Interim governor of Sinaloa

Acting Governor of Sinaloa
- Interim
- Assumed office 25 August 2026
- Nominated by: Congress of Sinaloa
- Preceded by: Rubén Rocha Moya

Deputy of the Congress of the Union
- In office 1 September 2024 – 16 June 2026
- Preceded by: Leobardo Alcántara Martínez
- Succeeded by: Sara Jaime Ontiveros
- Constituency: Sinaloa's 1st

Secretary of Education and Culture of the State of Sinaloa
- In office 1 November 2021 – 23 February 2024
- Governor: Rubén Rocha Moya
- Preceded by: Juan Alfonso Mejía López
- Succeeded by: Catalia Esparza Navarrete

Deputy of the Congress of Sinaloa
- In office 1 October 2018 – 30 September 2021
- Constituency: Proportional representation
- In office 1 December 2007 – 30 November 2010
- Constituency: Proportional representation

Personal details
- Born: 18 February 1976 (age 50) El Rosario, Sinaloa, Mexico
- Party: National Regeneration Movement
- Other political affiliations: Party of the Democratic Revolution (1999–2013)
- Occupation: Politician

Graciela Domínguez Nava (born on 18 February 1976) is a Mexican politician serving as the Interim Governor of Sinaloa since 25 August 2026. She previously worked as the Secretary of Education and Culture of the state and as a member of the Chamber of Deputies representing the state.

== Political career ==
Domínguez Nava is a native of Chametla in the municipality of El Rosario, Sinaloa, and holds a degree in sociology from the Autonomous University of Sinaloa (UAS). From 1999 to 2013 she was a member of the Party of the Democratic Revolution (PRD) and is currently affiliated with the National Regeneration Movement (Morena).

She has been elected as a plurinominal member of the Congress of Sinaloa on two occasions: in 2007, for the PRD; and in 2018, for Morena. Between 2021 and 2024, she served as education secretary in the cabinet of Governor Rubén Rocha Moya; she resigned that position to contend in the 2024 general election, when she was elected to the federal Chamber of Deputies for Sinaloa's 1st district. In Congress, she served on the lower house's standing committees on transparency and anti-corruption, education, and fisheries.

Following Rocha Moya's resignation on 24 August 2026, the Congress of Sinaloa elected her interim governor to serve out the remaining 14 months of his six-year term. (Note: Sinaloa is scheduled to hold a gubernatorial election on 6 June 2027, with the new governor taking office on 1 November 2027.)

== Notes ==
Political offices
Preceded by Rubén Rocha Moya	Governor of Sinaloa; 2026–present	Succeeded by Incumbent
