= Román Padilla Fierro =

Mexican politician

- Born: 12 January 1949 (age 77); Sinaloa, Mexico
- Occupation: Politician
- Political party: PRI

Román Alfredo Padilla Fierro (born 12 January 1949) is a Mexican politician affiliated with the Institutional Revolutionary Party (PRI). In the 2012 general election he was elected to the Chamber of Deputies to represent Sinaloa's 1st district during the 62nd session of Congress.
