= Mario López Valdez =

Mexican businessman and politician

Governor of Sinaloa
- In office January 1, 2011 – December 31, 2016
- Preceded by: Jesús Aguilar Padilla
- Succeeded by: Quirino Ordaz Coppel

Personal details
- Born: January 18, 1957 Cubiri de la Loma, Sinaloa
- Party: National Action Party

Mario López Valdez (born January 18, 1957), popularly known as Malova, is a Mexican businessman and politician, and a member of the National Action Party. He was a senator for the state of Sinaloa from 2006 to 2010 and municipal president of Ahome Municipality from 2002 to 2004. He served as Governor of Sinaloa from 2011 to 2016.

== Background ==
Mario López Valdez, a native of Cubiri de la Loma, Sinaloa, is an accounting graduate of the Technological Institute of Los Mochis (ITLM). In 1984, he founded the MALOVA hardware store chain.

== Political career ==
In 2002, López Valdez was elected municipal president of Ahome Municipality, whose capital is Los Mochis. In 2005 Governor Jesús Aguilar Padilla appointed him secretary of Planning and Development in the state government. He was elected to the Senate in 2006, representing Sinaloa for the Institutional Revolutionary Party (PRI), where he served on the Regional Development and the Environment, Natural Resources and Fisheries, and Agriculture and Water Resources commissions. On March 19, 2010, he resigned his membership in the PRI to run for governor of Sinaloa for the PAN. He was elected July 4, 2010, defeating PRI candidate Jesús Vizcarra Calderón, a wealthy businessman and Culiacán municipal president who had been linked to local drug traffickers, including Ismael "El Mayo" Zambada.

As governor, López Valdez was accused of corruption and links to organized crime. In July 2014, he supported a bill that barred journalists from covering crime and public safety stories. However, López Valdez pledged to repeal the law just a few days after its unanimous passage in the state legislature, following a national outcry.

Preceded by Jesús Alberto Aguilar Padilla	Governor of Sinaloa; 2010-present	Succeeded by Quirino Ordaz Coppel
