= Los Ninis =

Enforcement wing of Los Chapitos faction

- Founding location: Culiacán, Mexico
- Territory: Sinaloa
- Activities: Drug trafficking, extortion, torture, kidnapping, murder
- Allies: Sinaloa Cartel; Los Chapitos; Los Chimales; Gente Nueva
- Rivals: (Mexico) Mexican government Mexican Armed Forces; Los Rusos; Los Guanos; Beltrán-Leyva Cartel; La Plaza Cartel (United States) U.S. government

Los Ninis ('the NEETs') are the main armed wing of the faction of the Sinaloa Cartel known as Los Chapitos. Made up of loyal young hit men between the ages of 20 and 35, well-trained in urban combat operations, they operate as a security force for the leaders of that faction, as well as to torture and kill anyone who opposed Los Chapitos. They are also given tasks such as monitoring and taking care of drug laboratories, cartel camps and drug trafficking routes.

This armed wing would be under the orders of one individual identified as Néstor Isidro Pérez Salas, (alias "El Nini", "El General", "El 19" or "Chicken Little"), who has training and knowledge in the military field. The group is also made up of other high commands such as Jorge Humberto Figueroa Benitez (alias "El 27"), coordinator of El Nini's operations regarding the manufacture and trafficking of fentanyl, and Oscar Noé Medina González (alias "El Panu"), who was in charge of supervizing the security of the cartel's strategic points and coordinating the jefes de plaza until he was killed on 21 December 2025.

This group is also held responsible for unleashing an internal war between factions of the Sinaloa Cartel to impose the dominance of Los Chapitos. Its main center of operation is located in the city of Culiacán, Sinaloa.

== History ==
=== The Rise of Los Ninis ===
The federal government operations to capture Aureliano Guzmán Loera, (alias "El Guano"), as well as Archivaldo, Alfredo and Ovidio, sons of "El Chapo", according to Army intelligence reports, generated a meeting to prevent their apprehension.

The key piece in that meeting was a person identified as Gabriel Valenzuela Valenzuela, arrested in February 2018 by the Sedena, in a subdivision of Culiacán, Sinaloa, for investigations related to the ambush over a military convoy on September 30, 2016.

In a second gathering, the cartel made one more decision. Form another group, similar to the one started by Iván Gastélum Ávila, (alias “Cholo Iván”), arrested in January 2016 along with Joaquín Guzmán Loera. The gear of the creation of this group would be Néstor Isidro Pérez Salas, (alias "El Nini").

Pérez Salas, along with Alonso Limón Sánchez, (alias "El Poncho"); Rafael Guadalupe Félix Nuñex (alias "El Changuito Ántrax") and Gabriel Valenzuela Valenzuela, agreed to finance a similar group headed by "El Cholo Iván", under the command of "El Nini". They would take advantage of the livestock fair from November 14 to December 15 to infiltrate hitmen.

This new armed wing would have been created with the purpose of controlling the Sinaloan capital and maintaining the dominance of Los Chapitos over the cartel.

With him at the helm, they prevailed over "Los Dámasos", a faction that sought to support Joaquín "El Chapo" Guzmán and was led by Dámaso López Núñez (alias "El Licenciado", as well as the latter's son, Dámaso López Serrano (aka "El Mini Lic").

=== Rivalry with other factions within the Sinaloa Cartel ===
On November 25, 2019, members of the "Los Rusos" faction beat 11 municipal police officers who protected "Los Chapitos" for participating in extortion activities.

Generating that both groups dispute the control of the production and sale of synthetic drugs in Culiacán; although said, the conflict has not escalated to the leadership of the slopes of the Sinaloa Cartel, the greatest violent expression was on March 6, 2020, when both groups clashed in the Loma de Rodriguera neighborhood in Culiacán.

During that confrontation, Martín Antonio Acosta Cázarez, "Martón", operator of "Los Ninis" died and four of its members were arrested when they tried to "finish off" a wounded man from "Los Rusos" in the hospital.

They also compete with members of "Los Guanos" faction, which also have a presence in the center of Culiacán.

=== Other violent acts ===
According to SEDENA reports, this armed wing was the protagonist of the wave of attacks in Culiacán after the failed attempt to capture Ovidio Guzmán, a high command member of Los Chapitos. After the "Culiacanazo", this organization gained more power and relevance in the media, as they were given better equipment and weapons in case of a second capture attempt, becoming the main defense ring for Los Chapitos.

After the recapture of Ovidio Guzmán, on January 5, 2023, it was revealed that security was mainly in charge of "Los Ninis", which was defeated by the armed forces.

Subsequently, hitmen belonging to this group went to the Jesús María district, where the recapture took place, and tried at all costs to prevent the transfer of Ovidio Guzmán, unleashing a new wave of violence in Culiacán and in the rest of the state.

== See also ==
- List of cartels in Mexico
- List of gangs in Mexico
- Mexican drug war
- Sinaloa Cartel
