= Mayra Gisela Peñuelas Acuña =

Mexican politician

- Born: 9 February 1963 (age 63); Sinaloa, Mexico
- Occupation: Politician
- Political party: PRI

Mayra Gisela Peñuelas Acuña (born 9 February 1963) is a Mexican politician from the Institutional Revolutionary Party (PRI). In the 2006 general election she was elected to the Chamber of Deputies to represent Sinaloa's 1st district during the 60th session of Congress.
