= Rodolfo T. Loaiza =

Governor of Sinaloa

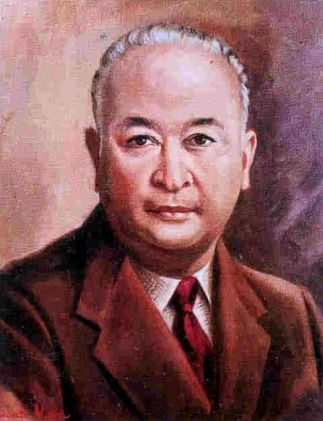

Governor of Sinaloa
- In office 1 January 1941 – 21 February 1944
- Preceded by: Alfredo Delgado Ibarra
- Succeeded by: Teodoro Cruz R.

Personal details
- Born: 27 June 1893 San Javier, Sinaloa
- Died: 21 February 1944 (aged 50) Mazatlán, Sinaloa
- Party: Institutional Revolutionary Party
- Profession: Politician

Rodolfo T. Loaiza (27 June 1893 - 21 February 1944) was a Mexican politician who was Governor of Sinaloa from 1940 to 1944. He was murdered on February 21, 1944, in the patio of the Belmar Hotel, in Mazatlán, Sinaloa. The murderer, Rodolfo Valdés, 'El Gitano', was one of the first hitmen in Sinaloa. After being on the run for a while was captured and sentenced to prison.
