= Jorge Humberto Figueroa Benítez =

Mexican drug trafficker (born 1991)

- Born: 2 September 1989; Culiacán, Sinaloa, Mexico
- Died: 23 May 2025 (age 35); Bariometo, Navolato, Sinaloa, Mexico
- Other names: "El Perris" "El 27"
- Organization(s): Sinaloa Cartel (El chapitos faction)

Jorge Humberto Figueroa Benítez (2 September 1989 – 23 May 2025), known by his nom de guerre El Perris or El 27, was a Mexican drug lord and Commander of the Los Ninis, the armed wing of Los Chapitos faction of the Sinaloa Cartel.

== Career ==
Jorge Humberto Figueroa Benítez was born on 2 September 1989 in Culiacan, Sinaloa. From adulthood he began working as a drug trafficker working for the Sinaloa Cartel. He became a right hand man of Nestor Isidro Perez Salas alias El Nini, who was the Commander of Los Ninis until his arrest in November 2023. After that El Perris became the Commander of the Los Ninis.

In 2019, he was the main commander in attacks against Mexican army for the release of Ovidio Guzmán López thus gaining trust among the Los Chapitos faction of the group.

In 2024, he was involved in the kidnapping of Ismael "El Mayo" Zambada who was then the leader of rival El Mayiza faction of Sinaloa Cartel. Reports indicated that El Perris was the one who tied up El Mayo and transferred him to the plane which landed in the USA, leading to the arrest of El Mayo.

The US government had placed a $1 million bounty for his capture.

== Capture attempts ==
=== Operation in Tres Rios ===
On 21 September 2024, the Mexican army tried to capture by raiding the Depas Clamont apartment complex, located in sector of Tres Ríos in Culiacán, Sinaloa where he was allegedly hiding. A series of gunfights ensued between Cartel members and Army personnel leading to the partial destruction of the complex. El Perris managed to escape through sewage tunnel and escaped the raid.

=== Operation in Navolato and Angostura ===
On 4 October 2024, another attempt to capture El Perris was launched, this time in coordination with both ground troops and Navy helicopters. The operation took place in the Navolato and Angostura municipalities of Sinaloa. The operation resulted in the capture of five of his senior associates, but El Perris managed to flee.

== Alleged betrayal ==
In early 2025, there have been reports of El Perris betraying the Los Chapitos faction and its leaders. The information leaked by him led to the arrest of El Güerito, El 200 and El Jando of the faction. Another incident in May 2025, almost led to the arrest of Iván Archivaldo Guzmán Salazar but managed to escape through tunnels.

Reports indicated he had planned to defect to the rival La Mayiza faction within the Sinaloa cartel and planned to take over the faction if Ivan was arrested and defected.

== Death ==
On 25 May 2025, a raid by the Mexican army tried to arrest him, but a shootout suddenly broke out between cartel members and the army which resulted in his death.

== See also ==
- List of Mexican drug cartel figures
