= Óscar Lara Salazar =

Mexican politician

- Born: 2 June 1962 (age 63); Badiraguato, Sinaloa, Mexico
- Occupation: Politician
- Political party: PRI

Óscar Lara Salazar (born 2 June 1962) is a Mexican politician from the Institutional Revolutionary Party (PRI). In the 2009 mid-terms he was elected to the Chamber of Deputies to represent Sinaloa's 1st district during the 61st session of Congress.
