= Governor of Sinaloa =

Elected public office in Mexico

- Gobernador(a) de Sinaloa
- Incumbent; Graciela Domínguez Nava since 25 August 2026
- Term length: Six years, non-renewable.
- Inaugural holder: Agustín Martínez de Castro
- Formation: 1831

List of governors of the Mexican state of Sinaloa:

== List of governors ==
Governor	Term in office	Election	Party
Alfredo Delgado Ibarra (1890–1948)	1 January 1937 – 31 December 1940	1936	National Revolutionary Party
Rodolfo T. Loaiza (1893–1944)	1 January 1941 – 21 February 1944 (assassinated)	1940	Independent
Teodoro Cruz R. Substitute	22 February 1944 – 31 December 1944	—	Party of the Mexican Revolution
Pablo Macías Valenzuela (1891–1975)	1 January 1945 – 31 December 1950	1944	Party of the Mexican Revolution
Enrique Pérez Arce (1889–1963)	1 January 1951 – 31 December 1952	1950	Institutional Revolutionary Party
Rigoberto Aguilar Pico (1905–1974)	1 January 1953 – 31 December 1956	—	Institutional Revolutionary Party
Gabriel Leyva Velázquez (1896–1985)	1 January 1957 – 31 December 1962	1956	Institutional Revolutionary Party
Leopoldo Sánchez Celis (1916–1989)	1 January 1963 – 31 December 1968	1962	Institutional Revolutionary Party
Alfredo Valdés Montoya (1920–2014)	1 January 1969 – 31 December 1974	1968	Institutional Revolutionary Party
Alfonso G. Calderón (1913–1990)	1 January 1975 – 31 December 1980	1974	Institutional Revolutionary Party
Antonio Toledo Corro (1919–2018)	1 January 1981 – 31 December 1986	1980	Institutional Revolutionary Party
Francisco Labastida (b. 1942)	1 January 1987 – 31 December 1992	1986	Institutional Revolutionary Party
Renato Vega Alvarado (1937–2009)	1 January 1993 – 31 December 1998	1992	Institutional Revolutionary Party
Juan Sigfrido Millán Lizárraga (b. 1942)	1 January 1999 – 31 December 2004	1998	Institutional Revolutionary Party
Jesús Aguilar Padilla (1952–2023)	1 January 2005 – 31 December 2010	2004	Institutional Revolutionary Party
Mario López Valdez (b. 1957)	1 January 2011 – 31 December 2016	2010	National Action Party
Quirino Ordaz Coppel (b. 1962)	1 January 2017 – 31 October 2021	2016	Institutional Revolutionary Party
Rubén Rocha Moya (b. 1949)	1 November 2021 – 2 May 2026	2021	National Regeneration Movement
Yeraldine Bonilla Valverde (b. 1992); Interim	2 May 2026 – 21 August 2026	Designated by the Congress of Sinaloa	National Regeneration Movement
Rubén Rocha Moya (b. 1949)	21 August 2026 – 23 August 2026	Rocha returns to his post, but leaves after backlash from his party from previous indictments from the US Government.	National Regeneration Movement
Graciela Domínguez Nava (b. 1976)	25 August 2026 – present	Designated by the Congress of Sinaloa	National Regeneration Movement
