= Congress of Sinaloa =

Legislature of Sinaloa, Mexico

Congress of the State of Sinaloa H. Congreso del Estado de Sinaloa
- LXV Legislature

Type
- Type: Unicameral

History
- Founded: 13 May 1831

Structure
- Seats: 40 diputados
- Political groups: MORENA (21) PVEM (6) PT (1) PRI (4) PAN (4) MC (2) PAS (2)
- Length of term: 3 years

Elections
- Voting system: 24 by first-past-the-post and 16 by proportional representation
- Last election: 2 June 2024
- Next election: 2027

Meeting place
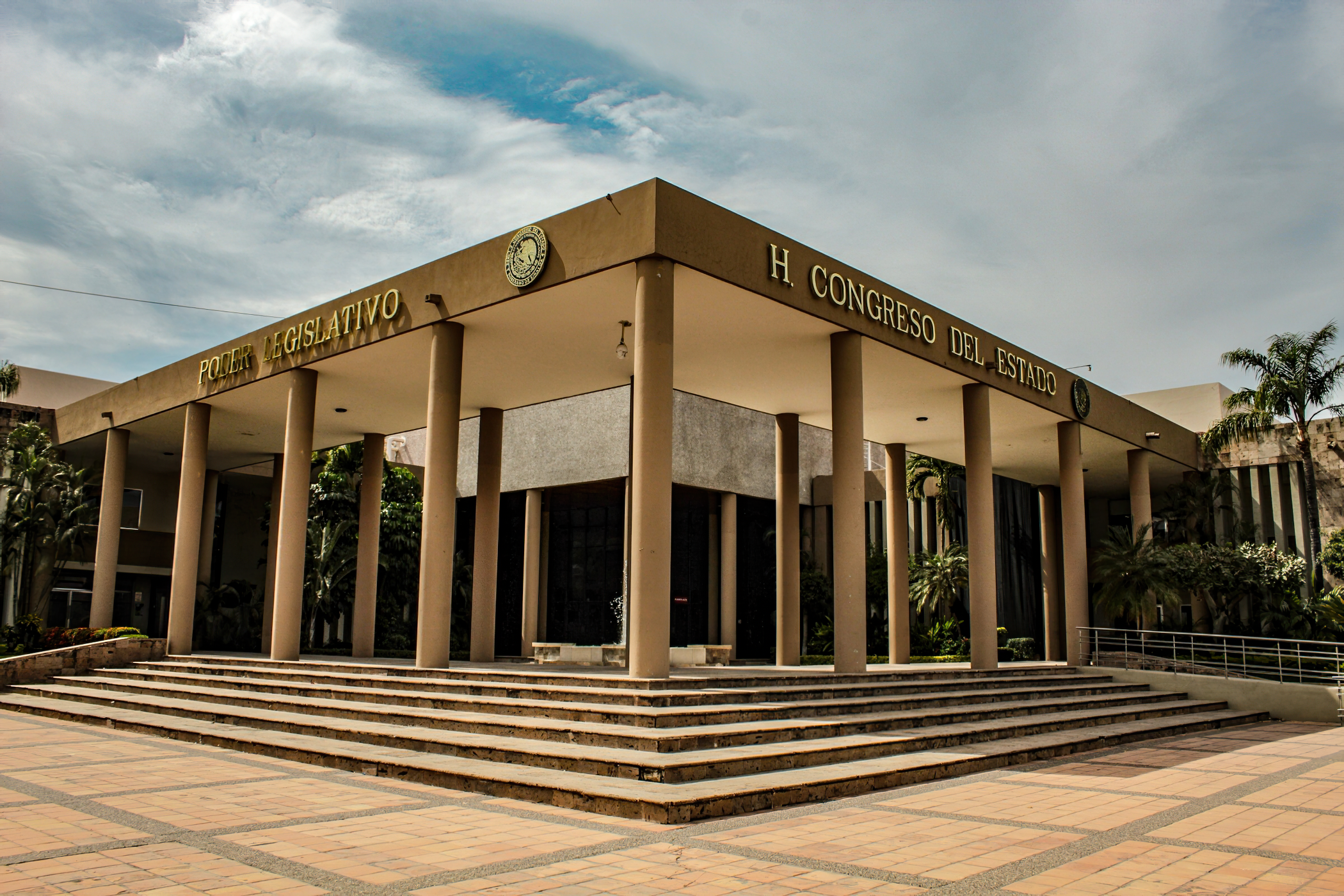
- Culiacán, Sinaloa, Mexico

Website
- https://www.congresosinaloa.gob.mx/

The Congress of the State of Sinaloa (Spanish: H. Congreso del Estado de Sinaloa) is the legislature of the Mexican state of Sinaloa. The Congress is unicameral. The legislature was established on 13 May 1831.

== Electoral system ==
There are 40 seats: 24 deputies (diputados) are elected by first-past-the-post in single-member districts and 16 are elected through proportional representation. The chamber is renewed every three years.

== See also ==
- List of Mexican state congresses
- Governor of Sinaloa
