= Capture of El Mayo =

- Date: 25 July 2024
- Location: Bellavista, Culiacán, Sinaloa, Mexico
- Type: Abduction
- Participants: Ismael Zambada García; Joaquín Guzmán López
- Outcome: Zambada arrested in the United States and sentenced to life imprisonment; Infighting in the Sinaloa Cartel
- Deaths: 1 (Héctor Melesio Cuén Ojeda)
- Missing: 2

On 25 July 2024, Ismael "El Mayo" Zambada, the co-founder of the Sinaloa Cartel, was abducted at a property outside Culiacán in the Mexican state of Sinaloa and flown to the United States. He was arrested on landing at Santa Teresa, New Mexico, along with Joaquín Guzmán López, a son of Joaquín "El Chapo" Guzmán, who had organised the seizure.

In a letter released that August, Zambada said he had gone to the property expecting to mediate a dispute between the governor of Sinaloa, Rubén Rocha Moya, and Héctor Melesio Cuén Ojeda, a former rector of the Autonomous University of Sinaloa who had been elected to the Chamber of Deputies weeks earlier, and that he was ambushed there and taken across the border against his will. Guzmán López admitted organizing the abduction in December 2025, which he said he had carried out in the hope of winning cooperation credit.

The capture set off a war inside the Sinaloa Cartel between Guzmán's sons and the faction loyal to Zambada, in which more than 2,400 people were killed in Sinaloa over the following two years. In Mexico, the Attorney General's Office opened seven investigations, among them one into whether American agencies had operated on Mexican territory and one into Cuén's killing, whose first official account proved false and led the Sinaloa state prosecutor to resign. In the United States, Zambada pleaded guilty in August 2025 and was sentenced to life imprisonment and ordered to forfeit $15 billion.

== Background ==
Ismael "El Mayo" Zambada co-founded the Sinaloa Cartel in the late 1980s and led it for more than three decades alongside Joaquín "El Chapo" Guzmán. Unlike Guzmán, he was never arrested or imprisoned in Mexico, and United States prosecutors attributed his longevity to the systematic bribery of Mexican officials. In September 2021, the United States Department of State raised the reward offered for information leading to his arrest from US$5 million to US$15 million. Within the organisation he was regarded as favouring negotiation over open confrontation, and he had acted as a mediator in its internal disputes. When the arrest of Alfredo Beltrán Leyva in 2008 led his brothers to break with the organisation, Zambada tried to mediate between Arturo Beltrán Leyva and Guzmán to avert a war; the attempt failed and years of factional killing followed. The Associated Press wrote that as head of the cartel's oldest faction he was in a position to act as an arbiter in the state's political disputes.

Guzmán was extradited to the United States in 2017 and sentenced to life imprisonment in 2019. Four of his sons—Iván Archivaldo, Jesús Alfredo, Ovidio and Joaquín Guzmán López—inherited part of his operations and became known as Los Chapitos; American authorities identified the faction as a leading exporter of fentanyl to the United States. Zambada's own network, known as the Mayiza, formed a separate structure within the same cartel. According to InSight Crime, relations between the two groups had deteriorated since Guzmán's capture in 2014, as his sons sought a larger role in the organisation.

Ovidio Guzmán López was captured in Culiacán in January 2023 and extradited to the United States that September, where he pleaded not guilty to drug trafficking charges in federal court in Chicago. His brother, Joaquín, had been indicted in the United States on similar charges and remained at large in Mexico.

== Abduction and arrest ==
=== Prelude ===
In a letter released by his lawyer on 10 August 2024, Ismael "El Mayo" Zambada said that Joaquín Guzmán López had asked him to attend a meeting on 25 July at which he was to help settle a dispute between the governor of Sinaloa, Rubén Rocha Moya, and Héctor Melesio Cuén Ojeda, a former rector of the Autonomous University of Sinaloa and founder of the Sinaloense Party who had been elected to the Chamber of Deputies the previous month. Cuén had been the governor's ally until the two fell out over control of the university.

The meeting was set for 11 a.m. at Huertos del Pedregal, a ranch by the village of Bellavista on the Culiacán–Culiacancito road, west of the Culiacán.

=== Ambush in Culiacán ===
Zambada arrived on the morning of 25 July with two men from his security detail, and found Cuén already at the property. He wrote that a large number of armed men in green uniforms were there, whom he took to be gunmen of Guzmán López and his brothers. He was shown into a room, where armed men forced him to the ground, put a black bag over his head and bound him. Guzmán López, who admitted organizing the seizure when he pleaded guilty in Chicago on 1 December 2025, had arranged for the glass of a floor-to-ceiling window to be taken out beforehand so that the men could enter through the opening once the two of them were alone. Zambada was driven in the back of a pickup truck to an airstrip and put aboard a waiting aircraft, his legs bound to the seat.

Cuén was killed at the property that day. The two escorts, José Rosario Heras López, a commander of the state judicial police, and Rodolfo Cháidez, long a member of Zambada's security detail, were not seen again; early accounts held that they had been killed at the site, and both were later registered as missing persons.

=== Flight to New Mexico ===
The aircraft took off from Culiacán, although the flight was first reported to have originated in Sonora. Prosecutors said that during the flight, Zambada was given a drink containing sedatives, some of which Guzmán López drank himself. The aircraft landed at the Doña Ana County International Jetport at Santa Teresa, New Mexico, near the border and a short distance from El Paso, Texas. Federal agents took Zambada and Guzmán López into custody shortly after it touched down, without resistance.

The aircraft was a Beechcraft King Air 200 bearing the registration N287KA, which the Federal Bureau of Investigation (FBI) later determined had been copied from another airplane and applied in adhesive vinyl; a forfeiture report attributed ownership to both Zambada and Guzmán López. Its pilot, Mauro Alberto Núñez Ojeda, known as El Jando, was released in New Mexico and returned to Mexico at his own request; he was arrested in Culiacán in February 2025 having identified himself under a false name, and the federal Attorney General's Office (FGR) confirmed who he was in July 2026.

== Aftermath ==
=== Cartel war ===
On 9 September 2024, fighting broke out between Los Chapitos and the faction loyal to Zambada, known as La Mayiza, which held the Chapitos responsible for his capture. The conflict centred on Culiacán and spread across the state, and the federal government deployed troops to Sinaloa. The newspaper Noroeste recorded more than 2,400 killings and more than 2,900 reports of missing persons in the state between September 2024 and 2026.

By 2026, La Mayiza had taken most of the territory previously held by Los Chapitos, and Zambada's son Ismael Zambada Sicairos, known as Mayito Flaco, had emerged as a leader of the reconfigured organization.

=== Investigations in Mexico ===
The Attorney General's Office (FGR) opened seven case files arising from the events, covering the abduction itself, the killing of Héctor Melesio Cuén Ojeda, the disappearance of Zambada's two escorts, the alteration of the scene, and possible irregularities by Mexican officials. By July 2026, they had produced more than 1,280 expert examinations.

==== Killing of Héctor Melesio Cuén Ojeda ====
The Sinaloa state prosecutor's office reported that Cuén had been shot during an attempted robbery of his truck at a petrol station in La Presita, north of Culiacán. Inconsistencies emerged within days: the closed-circuit footage released as evidence carried no sound, and staff at the petrol station said they had heard no gunfire. The FGR treated the recording as a possible staging, and its forensic examination of the property at Huertos del Pedregal found Cuén's blood inside the building, placing the killing there rather than at the petrol station and matching the account in Zambada's letter.

The state prosecutor, Sara Bruna Quiñónez Estrada, resigned in August 2024 after the federal findings were made public, saying that she was standing down so as not to create controversy that might affect any case file. The Congress of Sinaloa approved her resignation on 17 August 2024.

The federal investigation was classified as reserved until 2031, on the ground that disclosure would pose a risk to the public interest and to national security. Two years after the killing, no one had been charged with it, and Cuén's family said publicly that the FGR had given them no account of its progress. In May 2026, the FGR said that the investigation had neither been shelved nor suspended and that it bore no relation to charges brought in the United States against Rocha Moya.

On 19 August 2026, the FGR detained Fausto Ernesto Corrales Rodríguez at a shopping centre in Mexico City. Corrales had driven Cuén to the property, and his first statement to investigators described the shooting at the petrol station; he was charged with concealing the homicide and with making false statements to the authorities.

==== Involvement of United States agencies ====
Mexico has pressed the United States for an account of how Zambada was taken out of the country. United States ambassador to Mexico Ken Salazar said in 2024 that no U.S. agency had taken part. President Claudia Sheinbaum, who took office in October 2024, said that if an American agency had participated in the operation it would have violated international treaties and the Mexican constitution, and that Washington had not supplied enough information to clarify the arrest.

The FGR sent the United States government sixteen letters seeking information about the operation and the identities of those who took part, and said the replies were inadequate. In July 2026, the Attorney General, Ernestina Godoy, said that the FBI had provided false and insufficient information, and described the case as involving violations of Mexican and international law, an agreement reached outside the law, and a lie told by a United States diplomat.

=== Prosecutions in the United States ===
==== Ismael "El Mayo" Zambada ====
Zambada pleaded not guilty in El Paso on 26 July 2024 and was later transferred to the Eastern District of New York. The Mexican government asked the United States four times to return him, and in February 2025, Zambada himself applied to the Mexican consulate in New York for repatriation; Mexico President Claudia Sheinbaum said the request would be assessed as it would be for any Mexican citizen.

On 25 August 2025, Zambada pleaded guilty in Brooklyn to engaging in a continuing criminal enterprise and to racketeering conspiracy after prosecutors agreed not to seek the death penalty. On 20 July 2026, Judge Brian Cogan sentenced him to life imprisonment without parole and ordered him to forfeit $15 billion. Addressing the court, Zambada called for an end to the violence in Sinaloa, saying that "no one wins in a war like this". Sheinbaum said afterwards that Mexico would seek the return of the forfeited assets.

==== Joaquín Guzmán López ====
Guzmán López pleaded not guilty in El Paso alongside Zambada and was later prosecuted in Chicago, where he had been under indictment before the abduction. On 1 December 2025, he pleaded guilty to two counts of drug trafficking and to engaging in a continuing criminal enterprise, and admitted organizing the seizure of Zambada. Prosecutors agreed that he could receive a sentence as short as ten years. His plea agreement recorded that the United States government had not requested, induced, sanctioned, approved or condoned the abduction, and that neither he nor his brother Ovidio would receive cooperation credit for it. No sentencing date had been set at the time of the plea.

== Reactions ==
=== Mexico ===
President Andrés Manuel López Obrador, then in the final months of his term, said on 26 July that he did not know whether Zambada had been captured or had given himself up, and asked the United States for a full report rather than general statements. The security secretary, Rosa Icela Rodríguez, said that Mexican forces had taken no part in the operation. President-elect Claudia Sheinbaum said that the United States had not informed the Mexican government of the operation and that she awaited an account of what had happened.

Zambada's letter of 10 August said that the meeting had been called to settle a dispute involving Governor Rubén Rocha Moya. López Obrador urged caution and said that the governor's own account should be awaited; Rocha Moya denied the letter's account and said that he had not been in Sinaloa that day. The Institutional Revolutionary Party (PRI) called for his resignation and National Action Party (PAN) deputy Federico Döring accused the governor and Quiñónez, the state prosecutor, of staging the account of Héctor Melesio Cuén Ojeda's death.

On 19 September, with fighting under way in Sinaloa, López Obrador called the operation incorrect and illegal and held the United States government responsible for the violence. The Attorney General, Alejandro Gertz Manero, said that his office treated the case as a kidnapping rather than an arrest, because Zambada had been put aboard the aircraft without his consent.

Sheinbaum took office on 1 October 2024, three weeks after the fighting began. She claimed that Sinaloa had had almost no homicides before Zambada's detention, attributed a day of violence in Mazatlán later in October to it, and said that American agencies acting without Mexican authorization had caused the violence. By July 2025, her government had asked the United States six times for a report on the operation and had received no reply.

=== United States ===
The U.S. Attorney General, Merrick Garland, announced the arrests on 25 July as the detention of two leaders of what he called one of the most violent and powerful drug trafficking organizations in the world, and said that the two men joined a growing list of Sinaloa Cartel figures held to account in American courts. The ambassador to Mexico, Ken Salazar, said on 9 August that no American resources had been used: the aircraft was not American, neither the pilot nor the agents were American, and the transfer had been an operation between cartels in which one had handed over the other.

Salazar repeated the denial in August 2026, after the Attorney General's Office (FGR) accused him of lying. He said that the transfer had been arranged by criminals and that the capture should be regarded as a victory against violence.

== See also ==
- 2016 recapture of El Chapo – U.S.–Mexican joint operation resulting in the recapture of Sinaloa Cartel leader Joaquín "El Chapo" Guzmán after a gunfight in Los Mochis, Sinaloa
