= Ismael Zambada Sicairos =

Mexican-American cartel leader (born 1982)

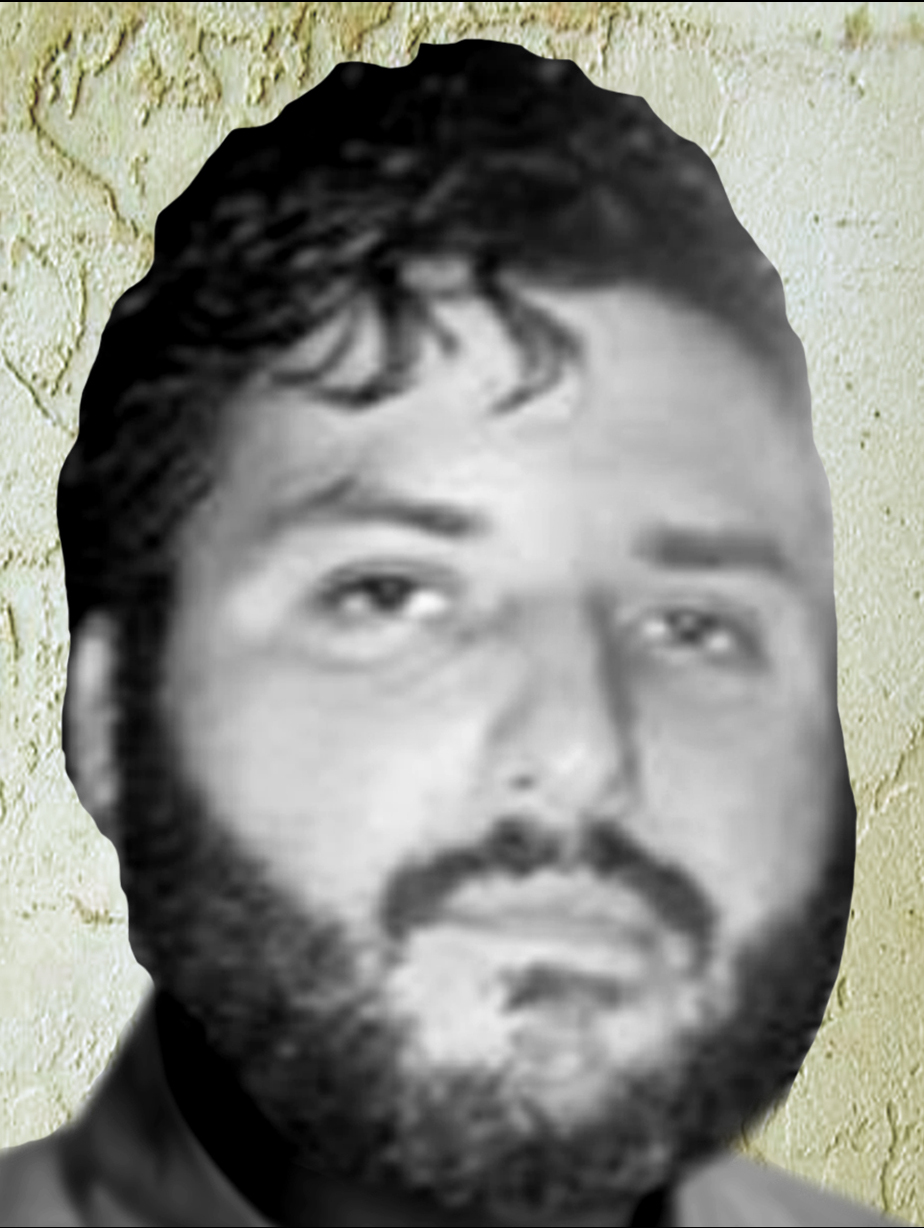
- Zambada Sicairos (DEA photograph)
- Born: 7 March 1982 (age 44); Anaheim, California, U.S.
- Other names: El Mayito Flaco, El MF, El Caballero
- Organization: Sinaloa Cartel
- Known for: Leadership of La Mayiza
- Father: El Mayo
- Status: Fugitive
- Criminal charges: Drug trafficking, money laundering
- Reward amount: $15 million
- Wanted by: DEA
- Wanted since: 2020

Ismael Zambada Sicairos (born 7 March 1982) also known by the alias “El Mayito Flaco” or “El MF”, is a Mexican-American drug trafficker and high-ranking member of the Sinaloa Cartel, who is the leader of the faction of the cartel known as "La Mayiza" or "Los Mayos". He is the son of Ismael "El Mayo" Zambada, one of the cartel's most powerful leaders. He has been implicated in international drug trafficking operations, particularly between the United States and Mexico. He has remained a key figure within the cartel's internal power struggles and is wanted by U.S. authorities for his role in large-scale narcotics distribution.

== Early life ==
Ismael Zambada Sicairos was born on March 7, 1982, in Anaheim, California. His father, Ismael "El Mayo" Zambada, was already deeply entrenched in the drug trade at this time. He has three paternal half-brothers in the Sinaloa Cartel, Vicente Zambada Niebla, Serafín Zambada Ortiz, and Ismael Zambada Imperial. His father has been a dominant force in the Sinaloa Cartel for decades, working alongside or in competition with figures like Joaquín "El Chapo" Guzmán.

Growing up in that environment, Zambada Sicairos and his siblings were exposed to cartel operations from an early age. He eventually assumed responsibilities within the organization, playing a role in overseeing drug trafficking logistics, security, and cartel finances. He has allegedly employed people to manage some of these logistics for him, including for drug shipments at the border cities of Mexicali, Nogales, and San Luis Río Colorado. His associate, Alfonso Limón Sánchez, is believed to handle much of his financial duties currently. Limón was imprisoned from 2014 until 2017 when he escaped the Aguaruto prison near Culiacán. He escaped along with four other people, among them members of Los Ántrax, which is the enforcer gang that was initially created to provide protection to Mayo Zambada. Limón Sánchez was pointed out as being a possible successor to the cartel prior to the arrest of Zambada García.

His nickname, "El Mayito Flaco" ("Skinny Little Mayo"), distinguishes him from his brother, Ismael Zambada Imperial "El Mayito Gordo" ("Fat Little Mayo").

== Criminal career ==
Zambada Sicairos is identified as the leader of the "Mayiza" faction, a branch of the Sinaloa Cartel that was led by his father. He is the only one of his four brothers to have not been imprisoned before, in addition to maintaining a relatively low profile until the arrest of El Mayo in 2024. As such, he was expected to inherit leadership of El Mayo's position.

His specific responsibilities have included:

- Drug trafficking operations – Overseeing the movement of cocaine, methamphetamine, heroin, and fentanyl into the United States. Particularly responsible for overseeing shipments of methamphetamine and its precursors from Asia to Mexico and towards the United States.
- Money laundering – Managing cartel financial operations, including money laundering networks operating in Mexico and abroad.

After the 2016 arrest and extradition of El Chapo Guzmán, tensions grew between factions within the Sinaloa Cartel. Zambada Sicairos has been involved in internal conflicts with Los Chapitos (a group led by El Chapo's sons) and Los Guanos, who both have sought to consolidate power.

=== Rivalry with Los Chapitos ===
The internal dispute between the Mayo Zambada faction and the Los Chapitos faction escalated after El Chapo's imprisonment. Mayito Flaco, along with his father, has resisted the influence of the Chapitos Iván Archivaldo Guzmán, Jesús Alfredo Guzmán, Joaquín Guzmán López, and Ovidio Guzmán López. This struggle has resulted in violent confrontations, particularly in Culiacán, and a "narco-war" in the rural Golden Triangle [es] area, a mountainous region in Sinaloa, Durango, and Chihuahua. The war between the factions took place in late 2024 and 2025 and left at least 1,600 people dead.

== Legal issues and fugitivity ==
Zambada Sicairos has been a fugitive wanted by U.S. authorities, particularly the Drug Enforcement Administration (DEA). He has been indicted in the United States for conspiracy to distribute controlled substances.

=== 2020 charges and DEA investigation ===
In 2020, U.S. authorities issued an arrest warrant for Zambada Sicairos on drug trafficking and money laundering charges. He has been linked to cocaine and fentanyl shipments which entered the U.S. through traditional cartel routes, including through Arizona, Texas, and California. Despite the charges, Zambada Sicairos had managed to evade capture, often moving between rural Sinaloa, Durango, and Mexico City, where cartel operatives protected him.

== Recent developments ==
=== Arrest of El Mayo ===
In July 2024, Zambada García was arrested at the Doña Ana County International Jetport in Santa Teresa, New Mexico. Reports suggest that Joaquín Guzmán López, one of El Chapo's sons, tricked El Mayo into boarding a plane which led to his capture, in exchange for a lesser sentence for himself and his brother Ovidio.

Ismael Zambada Sicairos identified as leader of his faction of the Sinaloa Cartel in a 2026 announcement by the Office of Foreign Assets Control

=== New leadership ===
After his father's arrest, Zambada Sicairos assumed leadership of the Mayo faction of the Sinaloa Cartel. This marked a significant turning point, as he became one of the cartel's top figures. However, unlike his father who is more prone to negotiating, Ismael Zambada Sicairos confronts his rivals directly for control of territories and strategic routes. The initial transition of leadership fueled ongoing violence, particularly in Culiacán, where Los Chapitos and the Mayiza faction have engaged in violent clashes.

== Personal life ==
Due to his involvement in organized crime, little is publicly known about Zambada Sicairos' personal life. He is believed to have several properties across Mexico, particularly in Sinaloa and Baja California. Unlike some other cartel figures, he has maintained a relatively low profile, avoiding public appearances and social media exposure.

== See also ==
- Mexican Drug War
