= 2023 Sinaloa unrest =

Cartel violence in Mexico

2023 Battle of Culiacan
- Part of the Mexican drug war and the war on drugs
Date	January 5–13, 2023 (9 days)
Location	Sinaloa, Mexico
Result	Mexican government victory: Successful capture and transfer of the druglord Ovidio Guzmán; Withdrawal of the Sinaloa Cartel's militant forces

Belligerents
Mexico	Sinaloa Cartel

Commanders and leaders
Andrés Manuel López Obrador; Luis Cresencio Sandoval; Rubén Rocha Moya; Luis Rodríguez Bucio; Alfredo Salgado Vargas; Cristóbal Castañeda Camarillo	Ovidio Guzmán López (POW); Iván Archivaldo Guzmán Salazar; Jesús Alfredo Guzmán Salazar; Néstor Isidro Pérez Salas

Units involved
Mexican Armed Forces; Mexican Army; Special Forces Corps; Special Reaction Force; Parachute Riflemen Brigade; Parachute Riflemen Brigade Special Forces; Mexican Air Force; Mexican Navy; Naval Infantry Corps; Mexican National Guard; Sinaloa State Police	Sinaloa Cartel factions: Los Chapitos (a.k.a. Gente Nueva); El Ratón Special Forces (special forces wing); Los Ninis; Los Salazar; Los Chimales; Irregular troops of gunmen and "Hawks" (watchmen of the Sinaloa Cartel)

Strength
3,586 (4,500 post-riot)	Around 5,000

Casualties and losses
10 soldiers killed 35 soldiers wounded 1 police officer killed 17 police officers wounded Visually confirmed per Oryx: 2 DN-XI infantry mobility vehicles 1 technical 1 Boeing 737-800 lightly damaged 1 Airbus C295 lightly damaged	19 cartel members killed 21 cartel members captured Visually confirmed per Oryx: 26 captured Sinaloa Cartel vehicles 14 destroyed Sinaloa Cartel vehicles
- One 14 year old boy injured

The 2023 Sinaloa unrest or The Second Black Thursday began on January 5, 2023, following the arrest of Ovidio Guzmán, son of jailed drug lord Joaquín 'El Chapo' Guzmán, sparking a wave of violence in the state of Sinaloa. In retaliation for the arrest of Ovidio Guzmán, cartel members blocked highways with burning vehicles and began attacks against the armed forces. The Culiacán International Airport was closed after gunfire was opened on two planes (one passenger and the other military). On January 13, the Mexican Secretary of the Interior Adán Augusto López Hernández declared that "order has been reestablished" in Sinaloa.

According to official reports, ten soldiers, a police officer and 19 alleged members of the Sinaloa Cartel were killed. The violence prompted the Mexican military to launch a series of armed raids using planes and helicopters to attack cartel members.

== Arrest ==
The Mexican armed forces and local authorities began a recapture operation against Ovidio Guzmán López, son of Joaquín "El Chapo" Guzmán and a high-ranking member of the Sinaloa Cartel, after a previous failed operation on October 17, 2019.

This new operation was carried out on January 5, 2023, in the Jesús María district of Culiacán, Sinaloa, Mexico and with the help of air support, Ovidio Guzmán was arrested for the second time.

== Unrest ==
Following the arrest, the US Consulate in Hermosillo shared that it had received reports of gunshots, roadblocks, and fires in the cities of Culiacán, Los Mochis, and Guasave. The Consulate reiterated the US Department of State's highest level of travel advisory warning against travel to Sinaloa. Sinaloa governor Rubén Rocha Moya called on the public to shelter in place.

Sinaloa Cartel gunmen opened fire on Mexican armed forces with a half-dozen .50-caliber truck-mounted machine guns. The army responded by calling in Blackhawk helicopter gunships to attack a convoy of 25 cartel vehicles, including the gun platforms. Then the cartel gunmen opened fire on the helicopters, forcing two of them down with "a significant number of impacts" in each of the two aircraft. The cartel then sent its gunmen to attack fixed-wing aircraft, both military and civilian, at Culiacán International Airport. One civilian airliner was hit. The gunmen also shot up airport buildings to prevent authorities from flying the captured cartel boss out of the city. But the authorities anticipating the resistance had loaded Ovidio Guzmán onto a military helicopter to fly him to Mexico City.

In Sinaloa's capital city, Culiacán, multiple roadblocks with cars on fire were reported, as well as multiple confrontations between the authorities and gang members.

The riots led to the closure of Culiacán International Airport when two planes at the airport, one passenger, one belonging to Aeroméxico and one military, were shot at. Shootings were also reported at the runway.

Aeroméxico also diverted planes for other Sinaloa regional airports. Attacks on two trucks on Highway 15 in neighboring Sonora led Aeroméxico to also cancel flights from Ciudad Obregon International Airport.

After the wave of violence in the city, parts of Culiacán, and numerous companies and banks announced temporary closures throughout the state. Journalists in the area reported multiple carjackings and demands for car keys.

The wave of violence spread throughout the state of Sinaloa, even causing neighboring states like Nayarit to be on high alert. In Los Mochis, Guasave, Ahome and Mazatlán, fires caused in stores were reported, as well as more roadblocks with vehicles on fire.

On January 6, the clashes and shootouts began to cease, after the transfer of Ovidio Guzmán, to Mexico City, where he was taken to the maximum security federal prison "El Altiplano", in Toluca, State of Mexico. On January 13, Adán Augusto López Hernández, Mexican Secretary of the Interior, declared during his visit in the port of Veracruz that, according to his communications with the governor of Sinaloa Rubén Rocha Moya, "order has been reestablished" in the state, even in the site of Jesús María, where Guzmán was apprehended.

== Aftermath ==
According to the Secretary of Public Education and Culture in Sinaloa, Graciela Domínguez Nava, conditions were deemed calm enough for all students in the state to return to in-person classes by January 16, remarking the fact that by January 9 all but 101 schools reopened after classes were suspended in three municipalities due to the violence that surged.

Inhabitants of Sinaloa observed the remains of charred cars, used as roadblocks the day before. The police and the army patrolled the desolate streets of the city. Federal transportation services closed their operations after a strong environment of insecurity, leaving several people stranded in multiple cities.

Ten soldiers, 19 gang members and one policeman died during the riots. Among the victims were an infantry colonel and his four bodyguards who were ambushed and killed by cartel members in Escuinapa, Sinaloa.

A Secretariat of National Defense-issued report put the forces used in the operation at 3,586 soldiers. The Secretariat also claimed that seized in the course of the operation were "four .50 caliber Barrett rifles, six .50 caliber machine guns, 26 long arms, 2 handguns, magazines, cartridges, various tactical equipment and 13 operational vehicles". Secretary of Foreign Affairs Marcelo Ebrard reported that out of 47 weapons found during Guzmán's arrest, 63% originate from the United States, while the rest are of European origin. Ebrard stated they're working with Europol to find the location where the weapons were sold.

== See also ==
- Operation Sinaloa
