= Battle of Culiacán =

2019 Mexican National Guard operation to capture Ovidio Guzmán López

Coordinates: 24°48′25″N 107°23′38″W

- Part of the Mexican drug war
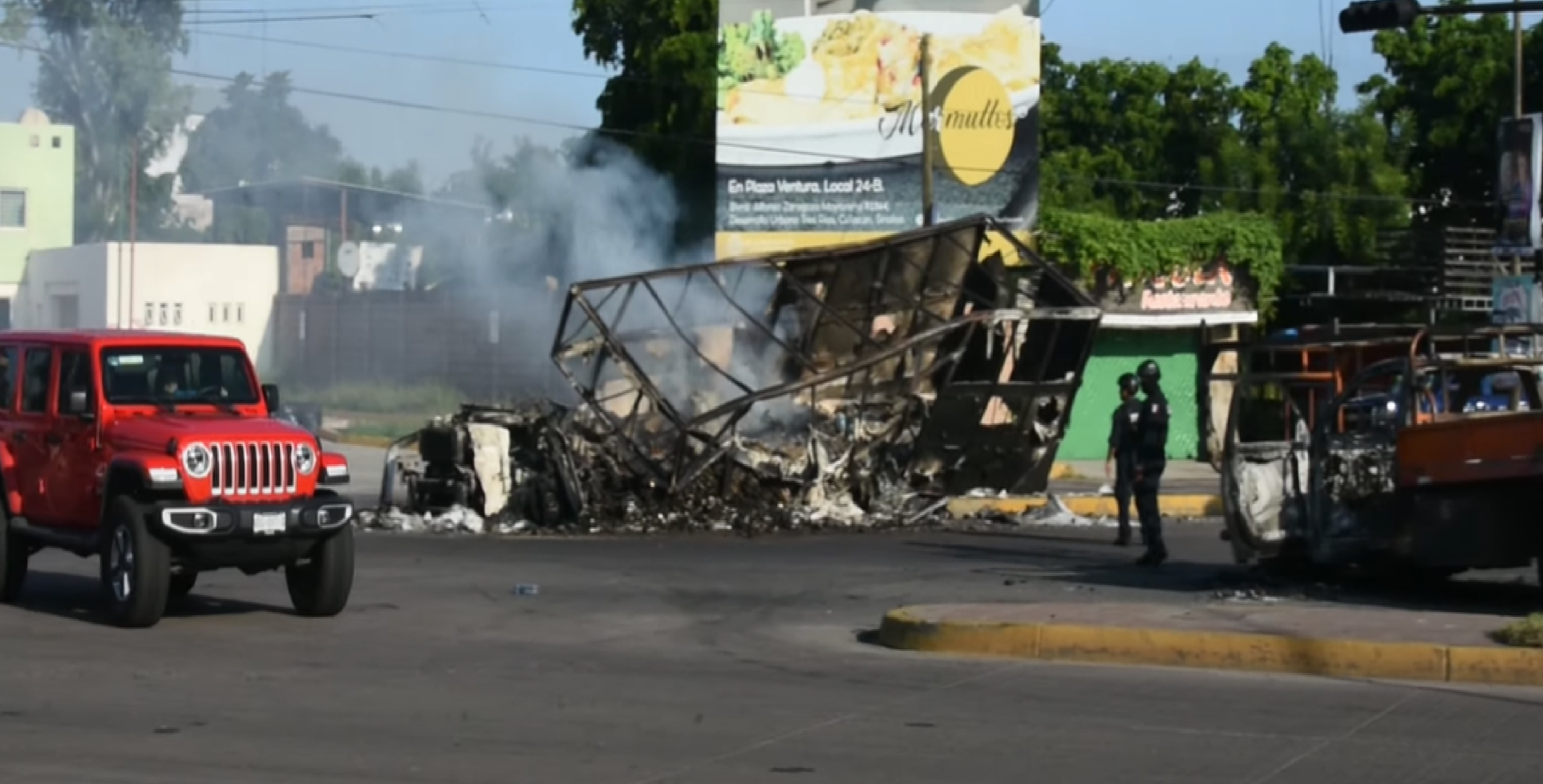
- Culiacán the day after the battle.
Date	17 October 2019
Location	Culiacán, Sinaloa, Mexico
Result	Sinaloa Cartel victory: Ovidio Guzmán released; 8000 federal troops sent to Culiacán (Immediately withdrawn)

Belligerents
Mexico	Sinaloa Cartel

Commanders and leaders
Andrés Manuel López Obrador; Luis Cresencio Sandoval; Alfonso Durazo Montaño	Iván Archivaldo Guzmán Salazar; Jesús Alfredo Guzmán Salazar; Néstor Isidro Pérez Salas

Units involved
Mexican Armed Forces: Mexican Army; Special Forces Corps; Mexican National Guard; Sinaloa State Police	Sinaloa Cartel factions: Los Chapitos (a.k.a. Gente Nueva); Los Ninis

Strength
350	700–800

Casualties and losses
2 killed	8 killed
- 4 civilians killed, 21 injured

The Battle of Culiacán, also known locally as the Culiacanazo and Black Thursday, was a failed attempt to capture Ovidio Guzmán López, son of Sinaloa Cartel kingpin Joaquín "El Chapo" Guzmán, who was wanted in the United States for drug trafficking. The attempt sparked attacks in the city by cartel gunmen that killed at least eight people, though some accounts put the death toll at 13. The Mexican government released Guzmán the same night.

== Arrest ==
On 17 October 2019, a convoy consisting of 35 police officers and soldiers drove up to Ovidio's house in the Tres Ríos neighborhood of Culiacán, Sinaloa. Initial government reports claimed that this convoy was doing a routine patrol of the area at the time and only approached the house after being fired upon, but after the battle, authorities admitted that the arrest was a pre-planned military operation done in response to a U.S. extradition request. Four people, including Ovidio, were found inside at 3:00 PM local time.

== Battle ==
Around 700 cartel gunmen began to attack civilian, government and military targets around the city, despite orders from Ovidio sent at security forces' request. Massive towers of smoke could be seen rising from burning cars and vehicles. The cartels were well-equipped, with improvised armored vehicles, bulletproof vests, .50 caliber (12.7 mm) rifles, rocket launchers, grenade launchers and heavy machine guns. Cartel gunmen engaged security forces in over 70 separate firefights while also setting vehicles on fire and attacking government offices. They also targeted a housing complex where soldiers' families lived.

56 prisoners in the city's prison rioted, took weapons from guards, and escaped in what The Daily Beast said "appeared to be a planned attack".

In the end, Ovidio was released after the cartel took eight servicemen as hostages, including one captured from local barracks in front of his children.

== Aftermath ==
President Andrés Manuel López Obrador defended the decision to release Ovidio, arguing it prevented further loss of life, insisting that he wanted to pacify the country and did not want more massacres, and arguing that the capture of one drug smuggler could not be more valuable than the lives of innocent civilians. While admitting that the security forces underestimated the Cartel's manpower and ability to respond, López Obrador also clarified that criminal processes against Ovidio were still ongoing, sending 8,000 troops and police reinforcements to restore peace in Culiacán.

Police officer Eduardo Triana Sandoval was ambushed at a strip mall and assassinated on 8 November 2019. Many media outlets claimed that he took part in Ovidio's arrest, however Cristóbal Castañeda Camarillo, head of Sinaloa State Police, stated he only took part in subsequent "containment actions".

Following another operation in Culiacán on 5 January 2023, Guzmán López was successfully recaptured by Mexican authorities and transferred to a maximum security prison in Almoloya de Juárez, resulting in the 2023 Sinaloa unrest.

== Analysis ==
Several analysts offer conflicting interpretations of the events. Some describe them in terms of war or civil conflict, cautioning of escalation between criminal groups and the state. Other analysts argued that releasing Guzmán set a dangerous precedent that could encourage violence to win concessions, while a third group framed it as a surrender of state authority. Not all critics opposed the release; and some commended the government's decision to prioritize lives over a single arrest.
