= Operation Mongoose Azteca =

Military operation carried out by the Mexican government

- Part of the Mexican drug war and the American war on drugs
Date	August 1, 2022 – January 5, 2023
Location	Jesús María, Culiacán Municipality, Sinaloa, Mexico
Result	Mexican government victory, operation successful, recapture of Ovidio Guzmán López

Belligerents
Mexico United States	Sinaloa Cartel

Commanders and leaders
(Mexico) Andrés Manuel López Obrador; (Mexico) Luis Cresencio Sandoval; (Mexico) Rosa Icela Rodríguez Velázquez; (Mexico) Audomaro Martínez Zapata; (Mexico) Alfredo Salgado Vargas	Ovidio Guzmán López (surrendered)

Units involved
United States; U.S. Department of Homeland Security; U.S. Customs and Border Protection; Mexico; National Intelligence Centre; Mexican Army; Special Forces Corps; Mexican Air Force; Mexican Navy	Sinaloa Cartel factions: Los Chapitos (also known as "Los Menores" or "La Chapiza"); Los Ninis

Operation Mongoose Azteca (August 1, 2022 – January 5, 2023) is the code name for a joint initiative by American and Mexican intelligence and military forces to uncover the criminal activities of the Sinaloa Cartel. This operation led to the capture of Ovidio Guzmán López (alias "El Ratón"), a son of the Mexican drug lord Joaquín "El Chapo" Guzmán. Following the operation, the Sinaloa Cartel orchestrated road blockades, gunfights, and riots in several municipalities, including Culiacán, the capital of the state of Sinaloa. After a period of sustained surveillance and joint intelligence work, Mexican forces located and recaptured Ovidio Guzmán in the town of Jesús María.

== Background ==
Ovidio Guzmán was first captured on October 17, 2019, at his home in Culiacán. Minutes after his arrest, the Sinaloa Cartel launched a violent offensive, with armed confrontations across the city and threats to attack civilians. On the orders of Mexican President Andrés Manuel López Obrador, Ovidio Guzmán was released and armed forces withdrew from the area to avoid further bloodshed.

The failed operation, often called the "Culiacanazo," resulted in eight deaths (including one civilian), sixteen injuries, nineteen street blockades, fourteen armed confrontations, eight soldiers captured and released, and 68 military vehicles damaged by gunfire. The cartel also attacked the military headquarters in Culiacán and the state's C4 command center. During the chaos, 51 inmates escaped from the Aguaruto prison after a riot in which five guards were disarmed; two of the escapees were recaptured within hours.

After his release, Ovidio Guzmán was seen in public in February 2020, attending the wedding of his half-sister, Alejandrina Gisselle Guzmán, at the Culiacán Cathedral, which had been closed to the public for the event. The wedding gained significant attention on social media after photos and videos of his presence were circulated.

In December 2021, the United States Department of State offered a reward of up to $5 million for information leading to the arrest of Ovidio and his three brothers.

According to leaked files from Mexico's Secretariat of National Defense (SEDENA), the US began coordinating with SEDENA in May 2021 on investigative operations against the Sinaloa Cartel, utilizing a platform called the Air and Marine Operations Surveillance System (AMOSS).

== Prelude to operation ==
Operation Mongoose Azteca was officially launched by August 1, 2022. Hacked emails from the Guacamaya group revealed that officials from the US embassy had intercepted communications between cartel members working for Ovidio Guzmán. These "hawks" were monitored in the Sinaloan municipalities of Badiraguato, Culiacán, Navolato, and Elota. US Customs and Border Protection provided SEDENA with intelligence reports from this surveillance.

Among the conversations considered relevant, which US intelligence logged as "events," were two wiretap reports from August 8 and 9, 2022, that mentioned Ovidio Guzmán. Below is a summary of the intercepted communications.

=== August 8 ===
Event 1: An individual identified as "UIM 1" scolded "UIM 2" after his "cocinero" (cook) was heard discussing operations. UIM 1 also confirmed that men from "Alacran" had begun an unspecified activity and asked UIM 2 about military movements in the area.

Event 2: A group of scouts spotted a small plane ("una blanca") in the neighborhood. UIM 1 instructed his group to monitor the plane's movements. SEDENA noted that this group provides security for the Sinaloa Cartel.

Event 3: UIM 2 asked UIM 1 if a non-urgent meeting could be arranged with "El Viejo," a nickname referring to Ovidio Guzmán.

Event 4: UIM 1 asked UIM 2 about the delivery of "aparatos" (equipment, likely weapons). UIM 1 instructed UIM 2 to deliver all the equipment, including rifles and an "M5" (a likely reference to an assault rifle).

Event 5: UIM 1 warned his network about a Marina convoy in the area and mentioned the presence of "Viejillo" and "Cholon Vago" Special Forces. Another user noted the arrival of "Kaibiles." The Kaibiles are elite soldiers from the Guatemalan army known to provide training to criminal organizations in Mexico; it has been reported that Ovidio's personal security detail received such training.

=== August 9 ===
Event 1: UIM 1 expressed his loyalty to UIM 2 and his boss, "El Raton" (Ovidio Guzmán's nickname).

Event 2: An individual identified as "CS Mochomo" asked about a black Ford Raptor being tracked near an OXXO store. The vehicle was reportedly loaded with rifles.

Event 3: Three minutes later, UIM 1 reported that the Ford Raptor was seen passing near a seminary.

Analysts noted that the OXXO store and seminary are located just 950 meters apart in the "Tres Ríos" area of Culiacán, a zone controlled by the "Los Chapitos" faction of the Sinaloa Cartel.

== Core operation ==
In the early hours of January 5, 2023, the operation to capture Guzmán began. A National Guard patrol in the town of Jesús María identified a convoy of six armored trucks. When the patrol attempted to inspect the vehicles, gunmen opened fire, initiating a fierce shootout.

During the confrontation, Ovidio Guzmán and his security detail retreated and barricaded themselves inside his fortified estate nearby. Mexican Army special forces unit, including the Special Reaction Force, the Parachute Riflemen Brigade, and the Special Forces Corps, were mobilized to the scene. The ensuing battle at the compound lasted for hours. With support from helicopter gunships, the special forces operators eventually stormed the estate. They successfully captured Guzmán along with eighteen other armed members of his security team.

== Transfer of Ovidio Guzmán ==
After his capture, Ovidio Guzmán was flown to Mexico City in a Mexican Air Force aircraft. While the plane was on the runway at Culiacán International Airport, it was attacked by Sinaloa Cartel gunmen in an attempt to prevent his departure.

Upon arrival in Mexico City, Guzmán was transferred to the custody of the Assistant Attorney General's Office for Special Investigations on Organized Crime, while Interpol Mexico prepared an arrest warrant for his extradition. He was subsequently imprisoned at the Federal Social Readaptation Center No. 1, a maximum-security federal prison in Almoloya de Juárez.
