= Joaquín Guzmán (disambiguation) =

Joaquín Guzmán (born 1957), known as El Chapo, is a Mexican former drug lord.

Joaquín Guzmán may also refer to:

- Joaquín Eufrasio Guzmán (1801–1875), politician and President of El Salvador
- Joaquín Guzmán López (born 1986), Mexican drug trafficker and the son of El Chapo
