= Sinaloa Cartel =

Transnational drug-trafficking organization

- Cártel de Sinaloa
- Flag
- Founders: Joaquín "El Chapo" Guzmán (captured); Ismael "El Mayo" Zambada (captured); Juan José "El Azul" Esparragoza Moreno
- Named after: Sinaloa, Mexico
- Founding location: Culiacán, Sinaloa, Mexico
- Years active: 1987–present
- Territory: Mexico: Sinaloa, Baja California, Baja California Sur, Durango, Sonora, Chihuahua, Coahuila, Edomex, Mexico City, Jalisco, Nayarit, Toluca, Zacatecas, San Luis Potosi, Colima, Aguascalientes, Querétaro, Oaxaca, Chiapas, Tabasco, Campeche, Yucatán, Quintana Roo; Latin America: Guatemala, El Salvador, Honduras, Nicaragua, Costa Rica, Panama, Colombia, Bolivia, Peru, Ecuador, Venezuela, Brazil, Argentina; United States: California, Arizona, Utah, Colorado, Ohio, Texas, Alabama, Georgia, Kentucky, Tennessee, Minnesota, Michigan, Illinois, New York, Puerto Rico, Oregon, Washington
- Membership (est.): 17,825
- Leaders: Alexis Loera-González (Primary Leadership); Iván Archivaldo Guzmán Salazar; Jesús Alfredo Guzmán Salazar; Ismael Zambada Sicairos; Aureliano Guzmán Loera
- Activities: Drug trafficking, drug manufacturing, money laundering, weapons trafficking, people smuggling, murder, kidnapping, bribery, terrorism and narcoterrorism
- Rivals: Jalisco New Generation Cartel; Los Zetas; Gulf Cartel (since 2021); La Línea; Juárez Cartel; Los Mazatlecos; Tijuana Cartel; Logan Heights Gang; Barrio Azteca; Beltrán-Leyva Cartel

The Sinaloa Cartel (Spanish: Cártel de Sinaloa) is a fractured Mexican drug trafficking organization and transnational organized crime syndicate based in Culiacán, Sinaloa, Mexico. It specializes in illegal drug trafficking, money laundering, and murder. As of 2025, the cartel remains Mexico's most dominant drug cartel.

The Sinaloa Cartel was originally founded as a branch (“plaza”) of the Guadalajara Cartel, co-founded by Miguel Félix Gallardo between 1978 and 1980. During Gallardo's leadership, the cartel controlled much of Mexico's drug trafficking corridors along the U.S. border throughout the 1980s, until his arrest in 1989, after which the Guadalajara Cartel dissolved and its branches (which included the Sinaloa Cartel) became independent organizations.

Throughout the 1990s and 2000s, the Sinaloa Cartel, under the leaderships of Ismael Zambada García (“El Mayo”) and Joaquín Guzmán Loera (“El Chapo”), significantly expanded its operations, establishing itself as one of the most powerful and influential criminal organizations in the world. The cartel would become heavily involved in violent conflicts with rival cartels like the Tijuana Cartel, Gulf Cartel, and future Jalisco New Generation Cartel, as well as continuous conflict with Mexican law enforcement and military.

During this period, the Sinaloa Cartel diversified its drug portfolio, becoming a major player in the global trade of cocaine, fentanyl, heroin, cannabis (marijuana), and methamphetamine. It developed sophisticated trafficking networks spanning across the Americas, Europe, and Asia, utilizing methods such as underground tunnels, maritime shipments, and corrupt border officials to smuggle narcotics into the United States and other markets. The cartel also became known for its strategic alliances, brutal enforcement tactics, and the ability to infiltrate local governments and law enforcement agencies, particularly in key trafficking corridors, further solidifying its position as a dominant force in the drug trade.

After the ultimate arrests of Joaquín Guzmán Loera and his son Ovidio Guzmán López in 2016 and 2023 respectively, the cartel was headed by long-time leader Ismael Zambada, as well as three of Guzmán's other sons; Jesús Alfredo Guzmán Salazar, Joaquín Guzmán López and Iván Archivaldo Guzmán Salazar. This structure would last until 2024, when both Zambada and Joaquín Guzmán López were arrested by U.S. authorities in El Paso, Texas, resulting in an internal conflict within the cartel that has split it between members loyal to Guzmán Loera’s sons and members loyal to the son of Zambada.

The cartel operates primarily in the Mexican states of Sinaloa, Baja California, Durango, Sonora, and Chihuahua, with presence in other regions in Latin America, as well as cities across the United States. According to the National Drug Intelligence Center and other sources within the U.S., the Sinaloa Cartel is primarily involved in the distribution of cannabis, cocaine, heroin, methamphetamine, fentanyl, and MDMA.

The cartel continues to operate as two separate entities, often employing sophisticated smuggling techniques, including tunnels under the US-Mexico border. The United States Intelligence Community considers the cartel to be the largest and most powerful drug trafficking organization in the world, perhaps more influential than Pablo Escobar's Medellín Cartel of Colombia during its prime. The cartel has had a significant impact regarding the war on drugs, both international and local politics, as well as in popular culture.

== History ==
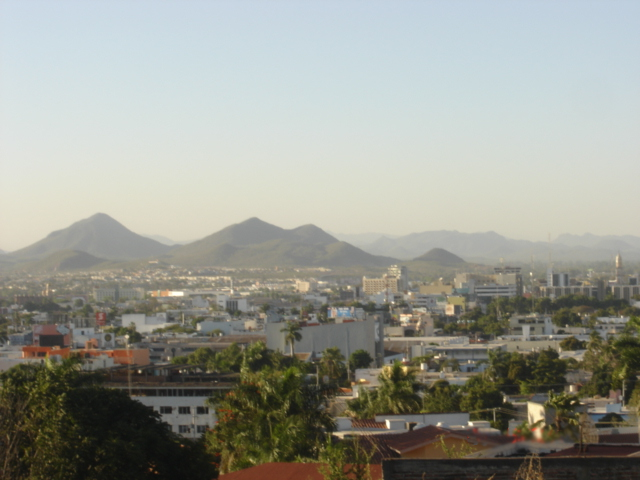
City of Culiacán, Sinaloa, a historical stronghold for the cartel

=== Avilés criminal organization ===
Pedro Avilés Pérez was a pioneer drug lord in the Mexican state of Sinaloa in the late 1960s. He is considered to be, along with Vicente Carrillo Leyva, the first generation of major Mexican drug smugglers of cannabis (marijuana) who marked the birth of large-scale Mexican drug trafficking. He also pioneered the use of aircraft to smuggle drugs to the United States.

Second generation Sinaloan traffickers such as Rafael Caro Quintero, Ernesto Fonseca Carrillo, Miguel Ángel Félix Gallardo, Ismael Zambada García and Avilés Pérez' nephew Joaquín 'El Chapo' Guzmán would claim they learned all they knew about 'narcotraficantes' while serving in the Avilés organization. Pedro Avilés would eventually die in a shootout with federal police in September 1978 in Sinaloa.

=== Guadalajara Cartel ===
Miguel Ángel Félix Gallardo, who co-founded the Guadalajara Cartel between 1978 and 1980, from then on controlled much of Mexico's drug-trafficking corridors along the United States border throughout the 1980s, only to be rivaled by the Gulf Cartel, which controlled some of eastern Mexico's drug trade. Félix Gallardo divided up his "Federation" by 1987, just two years after the capture and murder of DEA agent Enrique Camarena Salazar when the threat from American law enforcement became much more pressing. This division of the organization in the late 1980s led to the cartel essentially being made up of several smaller cartels that controlled their own territories and trafficking corridors with their own bosses. This would make it less likely that the whole organization would be brought down all at once. One of these cartels (called plazas at the time) was Sinaloa, with the city of Culiacán acting as its headquarters. In the late 1980s, the United States Drug Enforcement Administration (DEA) believed the Sinaloa Cartel was the largest drug trafficking organization operating in Mexico.

Gallardo was eventually arrested in 1989 and, while incarcerated, he remained one of Mexico's major traffickers, maintaining contact with his organization via mobile phone until he was transferred to a new maximum security prison in the early 1990s. At that point his nephews, the Arellano Félix brothers, left and further solidified the organization which came to be known as the Tijuana Cartel, while the Sinaloa Cartel continued to be run by former lieutenants Héctor Luis Palma Salazar, Juan Jose Esparragoza and Joaquín Guzmán Loera.

=== El Mayo and the Tijuana Cartel war ===
During this time, Sinaloa was considered to be at a major disadvantage since they were forced to move much of their drug product through the Tijuana corridor, which often put them directly into conflict with the Arellanos. This eventually led to Ramón Arellano Félix killing two of Guzmán's associates, thus leading to a full-fledged war between the two organizations. It was around this period in the early 1990s when Guzmán brought in freelance trafficker Ismael Zambada García (a.k.a. El Mayo), particularly due to his exceptional ability to work with and coordinate with other traffickers. Throughout much of the 1990s, Ismael Zambada also helped grow and expand the cartel while Guzmán and Palma were incarcerated. Before getting directly involved with the Sinaloa Cartel, Ismael Zambada García was a farmer, freelancer and small-time drug trafficker who would sell mere kilograms of cannabis (marijuana) and heroin before eventually becoming acquainted with Mexico's more elite trafficking circles. By the mid-1990s, according to one court opinion, the Sinaloa organization was believed to be the size of the Medellín Cartel during its prime.

Zambada also helped Amado Carrillo Fuentes expand the Juárez Cartel in the state of Chihuahua and helped incorporate some of the remnants of the Juárez Cartel into the Sinaloa Cartel after Carrillo's death in 1997. The Sinaloa Cartel was therefore believed to be linked to the Juárez Cartel in a strategic alliance following the partnership of their rivals, the Gulf Cartel and Tijuana Cartel. Following the discovery of a tunnel system used to smuggle drugs across the Mexican/US border, the group has been associated with such means of trafficking. The war between the Sinaloa and Tijuana cartels was supposedly at its worst from 1992 to the year 2000 with family members of some of the cartel's leaders living in fear or "everyday like it was their last", as stated by Zambada's wife at the time. However, Zambada also used this conflict to his advantage since the Mexican government began to crack down primarily on the Tijuana Cartel, Mayo used this weakening of his rivals as an opportunity for Sinaloa to step up in the trafficking world. By around the year 2000, Zambada became recognized as one of the biggest and most powerful drug lords in Mexico, having built strong distribution networks from Colombia to the United States. Mayo's traditional major distribution hubs were allegedly in Chicago, Phoenix, Los Angeles, Atlanta, and Denver. El Mayo was also reportedly the one who sent a private helicopter for El Chapo after he escaped Puente Grande prison in 2001. The Sinaloa Cartel was partially splintered in 2008 when the Beltrán-Leyva brothers broke apart from the cartel.

The Sinaloa Cartel has been waging a war against the Tijuana Cartel (Arellano-Félix Organization) over the Tijuana smuggling route to the border city of San Diego, California. The rivalry between the two cartels dates back to the Miguel Ángel Félix Gallardo setup of Palma's family. Félix Gallardo, following his imprisonment, bestowed the Guadalajara Cartel on his nephews in the Tijuana Cartel. On 8 November 1992, Palma struck out against the Tijuana Cartel at a disco club in Puerto Vallarta, Jalisco, where eight Tijuana Cartel members were killed in the shootout, the Arellano-Félix brothers successfully escaping from the location with the assistance of David Barron Corona, a member of the Logan Heights Gang.

In retaliation, the Tijuana Cartel attempted to set up Guzmán at Guadalajara airport on 24 May 1993. In the shootout that followed, six civilians were killed by the hired gunmen from Logan Heights. The dead included Roman Catholic Cardinal Juan Jesús Posadas Ocampo. The church hierarchy originally believed Posadas was targeted as revenge for his strong stance against the drug trade. However, Mexican officials believe Posadas just happened to be caught in crossfire. The cardinal arrived at the airport in a white Mercury Grand Marquis town car, known to be popular amongst drug barons. Barron had received intelligence that Guzmán would be arriving in a white Mercury Grand Marquis town car. Evidence that runs counter to a mistake theory is that Posadas did not look anything like Guzmán, he was wearing a long black cassock and a large pectoral cross, and he was gunned down from only two feet away.

As of 2014, it is believed that the Tijuana Cartel, or at least a sizable majority of it, has been either absorbed or forced to ally with the Sinaloa Federation, in part due to a former high-ranking Tijuana member called Eduardo Teodoro Garcia Simental, alias "El Teo" or "Tres Letras" allying with the Federation.

=== Dominance and interfactional conflict ===
By 2005, the Beltrán-Leyva brothers, who were formerly aligned with the Sinaloa Cartel, had come to dominate drug trafficking across the border with Arizona. By 2006, the Sinaloa Cartel had eliminated all competition across the 528 km (328 mi) of the Arizona border. The Milenio (Michoacán), Jalisco (Guadalajara), Sonora (Sonora), and Colima cartels were now branches of the Sinaloa Cartel. At this time the organization was laundering money at global scale, mainly through British bank HSBC.

In January 2008 the cartel allegedly split into several warring factions, which caused a major uptick in drug violence in Mexico. Murders by the cartel often involved beheadings or bodies dissolved in vats of acid and were sometimes filmed and posted on the Internet as a warning to rival gangs.

Before his arrest, Vicente Zambada Niebla ("El Vicentillo"), son of Ismael Zambada García ("El Mayo"), played a key role in the Sinaloa Cartel. Vicente Zambada was responsible for coordinating multi-ton cocaine shipments from Central and South American countries, through Mexico, and into the United States for the Sinaloa Cartel. To accomplish this task, he used every means available: Boeing 747 cargo aircraft, narco-submarines, container ships, go-fast boats, fishing vessels, buses, rail cars, tractor-trailers, and automobiles. He was arrested by the Mexican Army on 18 March 2009 and extradited on 18 February 2010 to Chicago to face federal charges. He filed a guilty plea agreement and agreed to cooperate with the government on 8 November 2018.

As of 2013, the Sinaloa Cartel continued to dominate the Sonora-Arizona corridor, which extends for nearly 375 mi (604 km). It relies on eight "plaza" bosses, leaders of a specific geographic region along the corridor, to coordinate, direct, and support the flow of narcotics north into the United States. Key cities along the corridor include the Mexicali plaza, San Luis Rio Colorado plaza, Sonoyta plaza, Nogales plaza, and the Agua Prieta plaza.

The Tucson and Phoenix, Arizona metropolitan areas are major trans-shipment and distribution points for the cartel in the US. To coordinate operations in the southeast US, Atlanta has emerged as a major distribution center and accounting hub, and the presence of the Sinaloa Cartel there has brought ruthless violence to that area. Chicago continues to be a major Sinaloa distribution point for the Midwest, taking advantage of a strong local demand market and convergence of several major interstate systems that offer distribution throughout the US. For a long time, the cartel also benefited from the relative ease of cash transactions and money laundering through banks with presence both in the U.S. and Mexico like HSBC.

In 2013, the Chicago Crime Commission named Joaquin "Chapo" Guzmán "Public Enemy No. 1" of a city Guzmán has never set foot in. He is the only individual to receive the title since Al Capone. The focal point for Sinaloa in Chicago is the city's "Little Village" neighborhood. From this strategic point, the cartel distributes its product at the wholesale level to dozens of local street gangs, as much as 2 metric tons a month, in a city with over 117,000 documented gang members. The Gangster Disciples are one of the local gangs most actively working with the cartel. The cartel's attempts to control the Chicago drug market have brought them into direct conflict with other Chicago gangs, including the Black P. Stones, Vice Lords, and Black Disciples, increasing violence in the city.

The Sinaloa Cartel has operations in the Philippines as a trans-shipment point for drugs smuggled into the United States. Since 2013, the cartel has been operating in the Philippines after a raid on a ranch in Lipa, Batangas, according to a statement by Philippine Drug Enforcement Agency (PDEA) director general Arthur Cacdac, and has entered the country without notice. President Rodrigo Duterte further confirmed the presence of the Sinaloa Cartel in the Philippines, saying that the cartel uses the country as a trans-shipment point for drugs smuggled into the United States. The presence of the cartel in the Philippines has worsened the ongoing war between drug lords, drug cartels and the government in that country.

On 4 July 2019, Juan Ulises Galván Carmona, alias "El Buda", was killed by two hit men in a convenience store in Chetumal, the capital of Quintana Roo state, along Mexico's Caribbean coast. El Buda served as the leader of the Sinaloa Cartel's drug trafficking activities and shipments from Central and South America.

==== Edgar Valdez Villarreal ====
Los Negros have been known to employ gangs such as the Mara Salvatrucha to carry out murders and other illegal activities. The group is involved in fighting in the Nuevo Laredo region for control of the drug trafficking corridor. Following the 2003 arrest of Gulf Cartel leader Osiel Cárdenas Guillén, it is believed the Sinaloa Cartel moved 200 men into the region to battle the Gulf Cartel for control. The Nuevo Laredo region is an important drug trafficking corridor into Laredo, Texas, where as much as 40% of all Mexican exports pass through into the U.S.

Following the 2004 assassination of journalist Roberto Javier Mora García from El Mañana newspaper, much of the local media has been cautious about their reporting of the fighting. The cartels have pressured reporters to send messages and wage a media war. The drug war has spread to various regions of Mexico, such as Guerrero, Mexico City, Michoacán, and Tamaulipas.

On 30 August 2010, Villarreal was captured by Mexican Federal Police.

=== Arrests and seizures ===
On 25 February 2009, the U.S. government announced the arrest of 750 members of the Sinaloa Cartel across the U.S. in Operation Xcellerator. They also announced the seizure of more than $59 million in cash and numerous vehicles, planes, and boats.

In March 2009, the Mexican Government announced the deployment of 1,000 Federal Police officers and 5,000 Mexican Army soldiers to restore order in Ciudad Juárez, which has suffered the highest number of casualties in the country.

On 20 August 2009, the DEA broke up a large Mexican drug operation in Chicago and uncovered a major distribution network operated by the Flores crew, led by twin brothers Margarito and Pedro Flores, that operated there. The drug operation allegedly brought 3,000 to 4,000 pounds (1,400 to 1,800 kg) of cocaine every month to Chicago from Mexico and shipped millions of dollars south of the border. The shipments were mostly bought from the Sinaloa Cartel and at times from the Beltrán-Leyva Cartel, and it is assumed that both cartels threatened the Flores crew with violence if they bought from other rival drug organizations.

On 11 May 2010, Alfonso Gutiérrez Loera, cousin of Joaquín Guzmán Loera, and 5 other drug traffickers were arrested after a shootout with Federal Police officers in Culiacan, Sinaloa. Along with the captured suspects, 16 assault rifles, 3 grenades, 102 magazines, and 3,543 rounds of ammunition were seized.

The Mexican Secretary of National Defense (Sedena) reported the arrest of Jesús Alfredo Salazar Ramírez, alias "El Muñeco" or "El Pelos", who was identified as the current lieutenant of the South Pacific Cartel in the state of Sonora. As stated by Sedena, "El Muñeco" worked as an administrator under Joaquín Guzmán Loera, and is believed to be responsible for the death of the activist Nepomuceno Moreno. Jesús Alfredo Salazar Ramírez was arrested on 1 November 2012, in the municipality of Huixquilucan, by military personnel working with the Mexican Attorney General's office (PGR).

"El Muñeco" is considered to be one of the most important lieutenants of Joaquín Guzmán Loera, evident from his control of the planting, production, and trafficking of drugs in Sonora and in the mountains of Chihuahua, which were sent predominantly to the US. He is linked to various homicides, among them the lawyer Rubén Alejandro Cepeda Leos, who was assassinated on 20 December 2011, in the city of Chihuahua, Chihuahua. According to the Sedena, he is the assumed assassin of activist Nepomuceno Moreno Núñez, who was 28 November 2011. Nepomuceno Moreno was an activist who sought justice for the disappearance of his son and joined the Mexican Indignados Movement, led by the poet Javier Sicilia.

José Rodrigo Aréchiga Gamboa (alias "Chino Antrax") was a high-ranking member of the Sinaloa Cartel. He was a leader and founding member of Los Ántrax, an armed squadron formed to protect Ismael "El Mayo" Zambada García, founding member of the Sinaloa Cartel. He was arrested on 30 December 2013, at the Amsterdam Airport Schiphol in the Netherlands, at the petition of the United States of America, and with the help of Interpol, on charges related to drug trafficking.

The cartel's loss of partners in Mexico does not appear to have affected its ability to smuggle drugs from South America to the USA. On the contrary, based on seizure reports, the Sinaloa Cartel appears to be the most active smuggler of cocaine. The reports also demonstrated the cartels possess the ability to establish operations in previously unknown areas, such as Central America and South America, even as far south as Peru, Paraguay, and Argentina. It also appears to be most active in diversifying its export markets; rather than relying solely on U.S. drug consumption, it has made an effort to supply distributors of drugs in Latin American and European countries.

On 19 December 2013, the Federal Police of Mexico killed Gonzalo "El Macho Prieto" Inzunza in a gun battle in Puerto Penasco, Sonora. Inzunza was believed to be one of Joaquin "El Chapo" Guzman's chief cartel leaders. Also in December 2013, three suspected members of the cartel were arrested in Lipa in Batangas province in the Philippines with 84 kg (185 lb) of methamphetamine. In February 2014, "El Chapo" Guzmán was arrested. The capture of the Sinaloa Cartel's "El Chapo" Guzmán ignited a fight over the trial's location. Calls for his extradition to the United States started just hours after his arrest. Guzmán also faces federal indictment in several locations, including San Diego, New York, and Texas, among other places. On 11 July 2015, "El Chapo" escaped from a maximum security prison, which is his second successful jailbreak from a maximum security facility in 14 years. On 8 January 2016, Guzman was arrested again during a raid on a home in the city of Los Mochis, in Guzman's home state of Sinaloa.

== Hierarchy ==
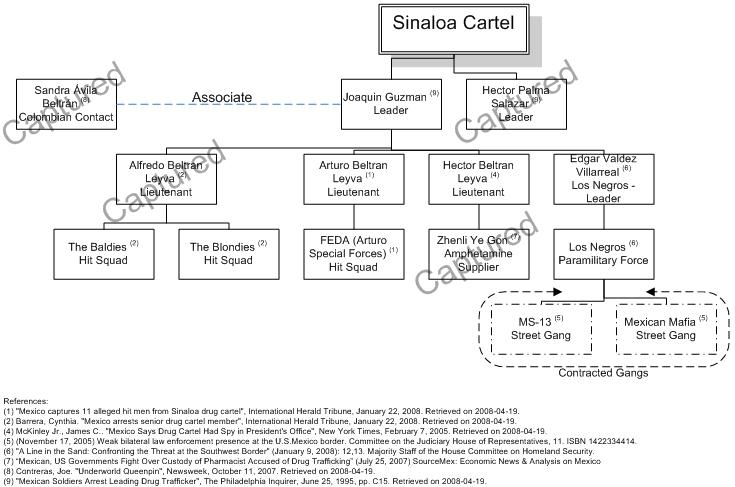
Sinaloa Cartel hierarchy in early 2008

The Sinaloa Cartel used to be known as La Alianza de Sangre ("Blood Alliance"). The Sinaloa Cartel is "a confederation of criminal organizations based on regional culture, and deep, shared blood ties that have been generated during decades of endogenous practice".

=== Structure ===
The Cipher Brief identified the CDS's international success as largely being due to a horizontal system of organization as opposed to the top-down hierarchy employed by many of its rivals. Having decentralized to expand abroad, as well as to allow itself to "[survive] brutal attacks by rival cartels and the capture of its most prominent leader, Chapo Guzman," the cartel's use of this strategy was compared to the semi-autonomous networks of subsidies and local branches used by many legitimate franchises; "Authority for decision-making flows across various components rather than moving downward in a formal chain of command."

=== Leadership ===
When Héctor Luis Palma Salazar was arrested on 23 June 1995 by the Mexican Army, his partner Joaquín Guzmán Loera took leadership of the cartel. Guzmán was captured in Guatemala on 9 June 1993 and extradited to Mexico, where he was jailed in a maximum security prison, but on 19 January 2001, Guzmán escaped and resumed his command of the Sinaloa Cartel.

Guzmán has two close associates, Ismael Zambada García and Ignacio Coronel Villareal. Guzman and Zambada became Mexico's top drug kingpins in 2003, after the arrest of their rival Osiel Cárdenas Guillén of the Gulf Cartel. Another close associate, Javier Torres Félix, was arrested and extradited to the U.S. in December 2006. On 29 July 2010, Ignacio Coronel was killed in a shootout with the Mexican military in Zapopan, Jalisco.

Guzmán was captured on 22 February 2014 overnight by American and Mexican authorities. On 11 July 2015, he escaped from the Federal Social Readaption Center No. 1, a maximum-security prison in the State of Mexico, through a tunnel in his prison cell. Guzmán resumed his command of the Sinaloa Cartel; however, on 8 January 2016, Guzmán was captured again during a raid on a home in the city of Los Mochis, in Guzmán's home state of Sinaloa. With the arrest of Joaquín Guzmán Loera, Ismael Zambada has assumed most of the leadership of the Sinaloa Cartel.

On 24 June 2020, Zambada was revealed to be "sick with diabetes", which reportedly gave El Chapo's sons more influence over the Sinaloa Cartel. This also ended an attempt to recruit former high-ranking Mexican drug lords Rafael and Miguel Caro Quintero as members of the Sinaloa Cartel due to the refusal of El Chapo's sons to grant them leadership status. Under Zambada's leadership, the Sinaloa Cartel had been willing to negotiate potential leadership for the Caro Quintero brothers due to their histories as bosses in the predecessor organization.

=== Mayos and Chapitos split ===
It was believed that while Guzmán's relatives and friends scrambled for marginal leadership positions in the organization following his arrest, the real top leader was still Ismael Zambada, who allegedly mediated power between them and allowed them an umbrella of the organization to work autonomously. As of November 2022, the factions were believed to have reconciled their recent differences in order to come together to battle the Jalisco New Generation Cartel.

At the time of his arrest on 5 January 2023, Ovidio Guzmán (the son of Chapo Guzman) was believed to be the leader of the cartel's Chapitos faction. On 15 September 2023, Ovidio would be extradited to the United States.

Co-founder and leader Ismael "El Mayo" Zambada and Joaquín Guzmán López, one of the sons of El Chapo, were arrested by U.S. authorities in El Paso, Texas, on 25 July 2024. Thereafter, U.S. government announcements throught the Treasury Department have targeted the cartel as two groups: Los Chapitos and Los Mayos. The Treasury describes the two groups as "deadlocked in a costly civil war that has required both factions to reconstitute and rely on new leadership to take charge".

In September 2026, a U.S. Treasury announcement of sanctions described Ismael Zambada Sicairos as leader of the active Mayos faction.

Command and control of the Chapitos and Mayos factions of the Sinaloa Cartel

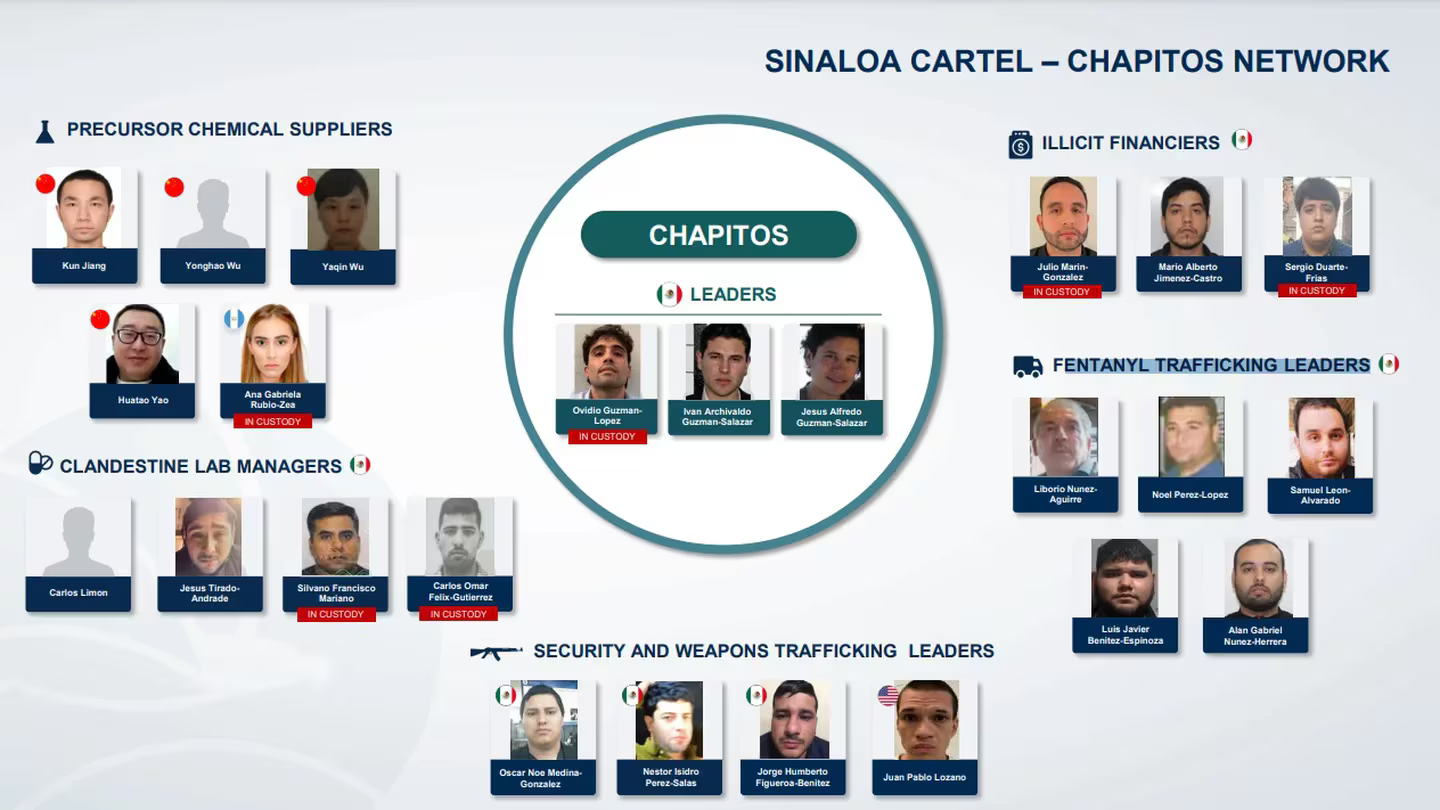
Sinaloa Cartel "Chapito" faction hierarchy described by the Drug Enforcement Administration in early 2023.

Sinaloa Cartel Mayo faction described in a 2026 announcement by the Office of Foreign Assets Control

== Operations ==
Of illicit substances, the cartel's operations seem to mostly favor the trade of cocaine and opioids, particularly in a distribution hub like Chicago, where demand for methamphetamine is relatively low. According to the U.S. Attorney General, the Sinaloa Cartel was responsible for importing into the United States and distributing nearly 200 short tons (180 t) of cocaine and large amounts of heroin between 1990 and 2008. However, during the second wave of America's opioid epidemic in the mid-2010s, which was driven largely by heroin, the prevalence and trafficking of fentanyl began to increase exponentially, leading to the epidemic's third wave and eventually turning it into the deadliest drug epidemic in U.S. history. Additionally, around 2014 a measurable rise in Colombian cocaine production and global consumption began to increase annually up to the present, currently marking a new high-point for the global use of cocaine. The cartel appears to still have major methamphetamine operations in cities throughout the U.S., such as in San Diego and Atlanta. The CDS as well as other large Mexican cartels have set up major cannabis (marijuana) growing operations in the remote forests and deserts of California.

=== Territory and presence ===
According to the Secretariat of Finance and Public Credit in Mexico City, the cartel has palpable territory within the Mexican regions of Sinaloa, Baja California, Baja California Sur, Durango, Sonora, Chihuahua, Coahuila, Edomex, Mexico City, Jalisco, Zacatecas, Colima, Aguascalientes, Querétaro, Guerrero, Oaxaca, Chiapas, Tabasco, Campeche, Yucatán and Quintana Roo, as of 2020.

==== Sinaloa ====
Due to the leadership of the organization essentially being split between the Mayo Zambada and Los Chapitos factions of the cartel, much of the state of Sinaloa is also split territorially. Within Sinaloa, the municipalities of El Fuerte, Badiraguato, Mocorito, Angostura, Navolato, Concordia, Rosario, Escuinapa, and half of Culiacán are controlled by Los Chapitos, while San Ignacio, Elota, and the other half of the Culiacán municipality are reportedly controlled by Mayo. The municipalities of Cosala and Mazatlán are said to have more than one group controlling the territory as well as some of the northern regions of the state, which are purportedly partially controlled by the Beltrán-Leyva Organization.

==== International ====
Despite its measured and challenged presence in Mexico, the Federation is also well-known for its widespread international presence as well as its many transnational criminal operations and partners. Locations outside Mexico include Latin America (Guatemala, El Salvador, Honduras, Nicaragua, Costa Rica, Panama, Colombia, Bolivia, Peru, Ecuador, Venezuela, Brazil, Argentina), the Anglo-Caribbean region (Belize, Guyana), Canada (British Columbia, Eastern Canada) the United States (primarily the Southwest, Southern and parts of the Mid-Atlantic) and recently in the Pacific (New Zealand, Australia, and imports of raw products/chemicals from China) as drug prices for methamphetamine and cocaine tend to be higher in the Pacific than in the United States.

=== Tijuana Airport/Drug Super Tunnels ===
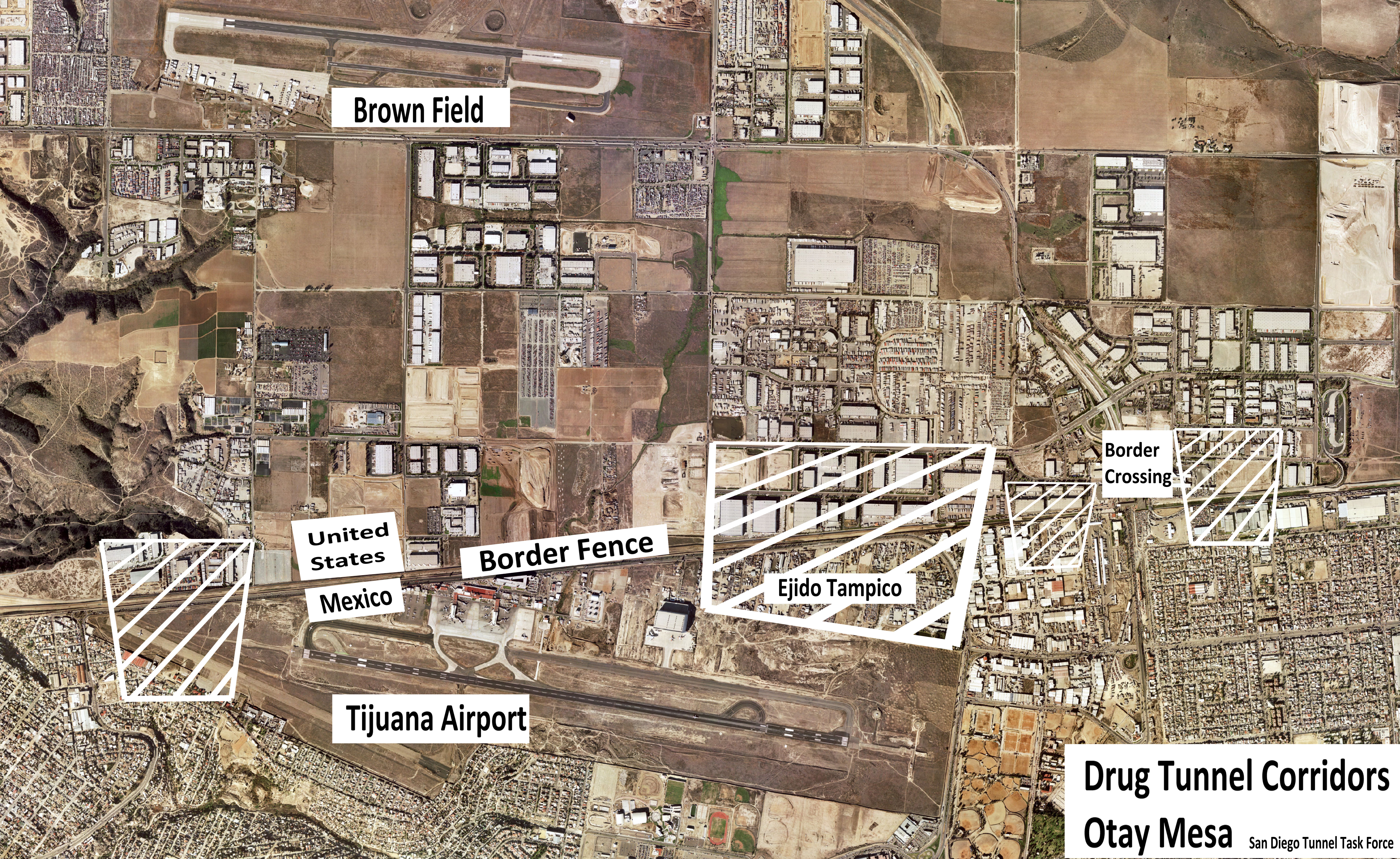
Image 1: Drug tunnel corridors Tijuana airport/Otay Mesa

In 1989, the Sinaloa Cartel dug its first drug tunnel between a house in Agua Prieta, Sonora to a warehouse located in Douglas, Arizona. The 300 feet (91 m) tunnel was discovered in May 1990. Following the discovery by U.S. Customs and Mexican Federal Police, the Sinaloa Cartel began to focus their smuggling operations towards Tijuana and Otay Mesa, San Diego where it acquired a warehouse in 1992.

After the assassination of Cardinal Juan Jesús Posadas Ocampo and six others at the Guadalajara airport on 24 May 1993, the gunmen boarded a commercial jet. When the jet landed at the Tijuana airport, both police and military units failed to cordon off the aircraft, and the gunmen escaped. On 31 May 1993, Mexican federal agents searching for the gunmen found a partially completed 1,500 feet (460 m) tunnel adjacent to the Tijuana airport, crossing under the U.S.-Mexico border to a warehouse on Otay Mesa in San Diego. It was discovered as Mexican and San Diego officials were discussing the creation of a cross-border airport between Tijuana and Otay Mesa, which would have undermined the drug tunneling operations in the area (see History of the Cross Border Xpress). The tunnel was described by the DEA in San Diego as the "Taj Mahal" of drug tunnels along the U.S.-Mexico border and was linked to Joaquin 'El Chapo' Guzmán. It was five times longer than the Agua Prieta-Douglas tunnel and became the first of a series of drug "super tunnels" in Otay Mesa originating in and around the Tijuana airport through the former Ejido Tampico. The "super tunnels" were equipped with power, ventilation, and rail tracks to allow the efficient movement of large loads of narcotics across the U.S.-Mexico border. As seen on image 1 Drug tunnel corridors, the close proximity of the former Ejido Tampico to the Tijuana airport and U.S.-Mexico border made it an ideal staging area for smuggling operations into the United States.

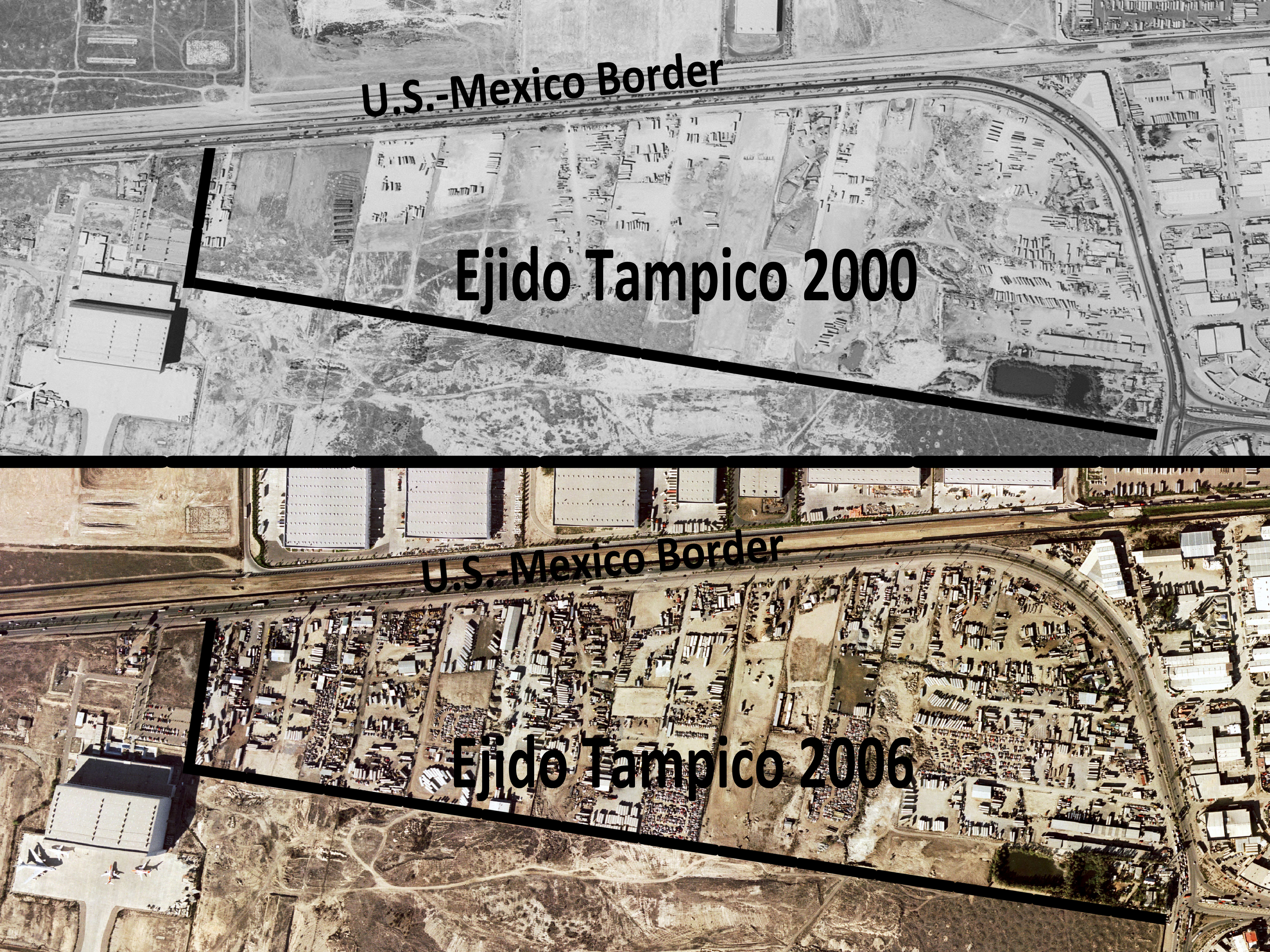
Image 2: Ejido Tampico comparison between 2000 and 2006

The Mexican government's conflict with the former Ejido Tampico dated back to 1970, when they expropriated 320 hectares (790 acres) of the Ejido Tampico to build a new runway and passenger terminal at the Tijuana airport and agreed to pay the displaced ejidatarios (the communal farmers) $1.4 million pesos ($112,000 U.S. dollars in 1970). When the Mexican government failed to indemnify the ejidatarios for their lost farmland, they reoccupied a 79 hectares (200 acres) portion of the Tijuana airport and threatened armed conflict.

As shown by image 2 Ejido Tampico, from 1970 to 2000, the occupied land at the Tijuana airport remained relatively undeveloped. In 1999, the Tijuana airport was privatized and became part of a 12-airport network known as Grupo Aeroportuario del Pacífico (Pacific Airport Group). In an attempt to resolve the dispute and remove the ejidatarios from the privatized Tijuana airport, the Mexican government established a value on the expropriated 320 hectares (790 acres) at $1.2 million pesos ($125,560 U.S. dollars in 1999) while the ejidatarios of the former Ejido Tampico taking into account the increase in property values from 1970 to 1999 and the privatization of the Tijuana airport established a commercial value on their lost land at $2.8 billion pesos ($294 million U.S. dollars).

In 2002, Mexican President Vicente Fox, who had promised to resolve the issue, also failed. As shown image 2 Ejido Tampico comparison between 2000 and 2006, the ejidatarios then proceeded to commercially develop the 79 hectares (200 acres) area at the Tijuana airport by leasing buildings and parcels to trucking and storage companies. As shown by image 3 Drug Trafficking Tunnel, in 2006, the unpermitted development allowed the building of a 2,400-foot (730-meter) drug "super tunnel" originating from the former Ejido Tampico and adjacent to the Tijuana airport's runway. As prior drug tunnels, it crossed under the U.S.-Mexico border into a warehouse on Otay Mesa in San Diego with the capacity to move multi-ton loads of narcotics.

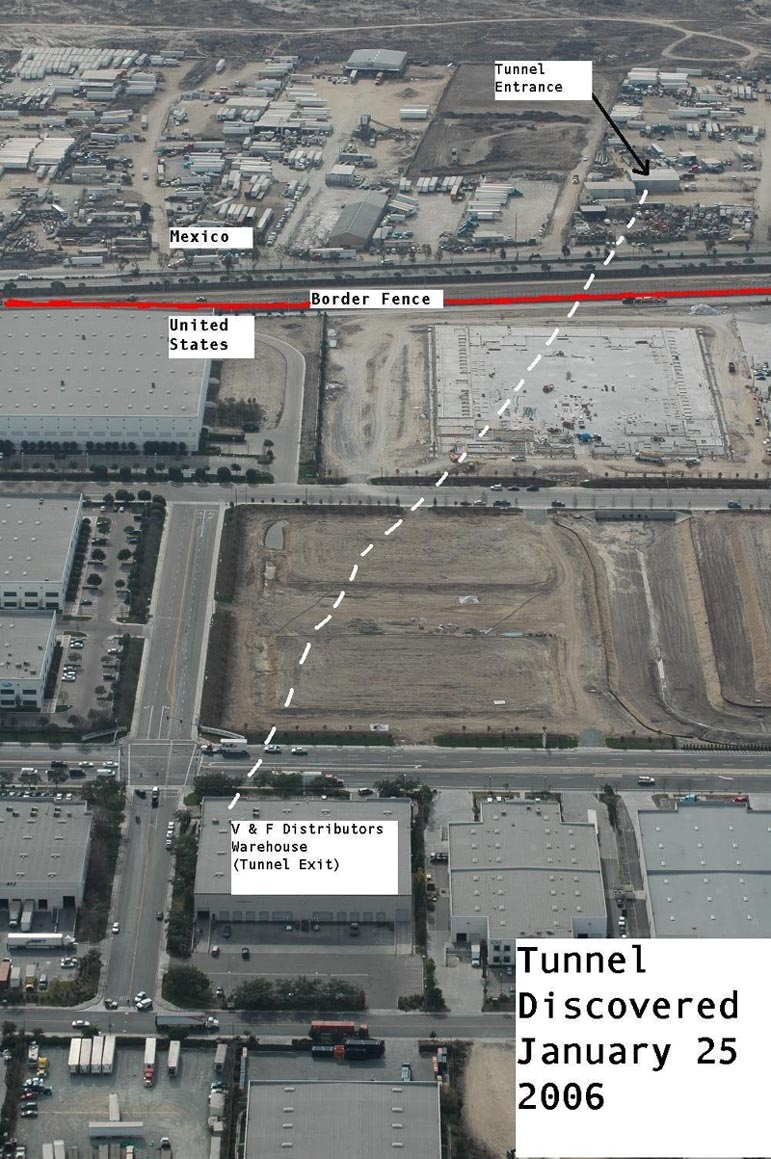
Image 3: Drug trafficking tunnel under the U.S.-Mexico border used by the Sinaloa Cartel from the Ejido Tampico

Similar to the "Taj Mahal" of drug tunnels discovered on Otay Mesa in 1993, the 2006 drug "super tunnel" was traced back to the Sinaloa Cartel. With unregulated trucking and warehouse operations, the former Ejido Tampico became a major distribution point for narcotics being moved into the United States. In the ensuing years, drug tunnels moving tons of narcotics were detected in and around the Tijuana airport. The former Ejido Tampico also continued to expand its unpermitted development and more drug tunnels were discovered operating within its boundary to warehouses located on Otay Mesa in San Diego, California.

In 2011, at the westerly end of the Tijuana airport a 1,800-foot (550-meter) drug "super tunnel" was discovered dug under the airport's 10/28 runway from a warehouse located 980 feet (300 meters) from Mexico's 12th Military Air Base and 330 feet (100 meters) from a Mexican Federal Police station. As with prior "super tunnels", it was equipped with an elevator and electric rail cars to efficiently ferry narcotics across the U.S.-Mexico border. In December 2016, one month prior Joaquín 'El Chapo' Guzmán Loera's extradition to the U.S., two "super tunnels", one in operation while the other was under construction, were discovered by Mexican agents adjacent to the Tijuana airport/Ejido Tampico and the Otay Mesa border crossing. Both were associated with the Sinaloa Cartel.

On 21 June 2017, Joaquín 'El Chapo' Guzmán's "girlfriend" and former legislator of the state of Sinaloa, Lucero Guadalupe Sánchez López, was arrested at the Tijuana airport's Cross Border Xpress by CBP (U.S. Customs and Border Protection) officers as she crossed into the U.S. She was charged with drug conspiracy and money laundering, and had been with Joaquín Guzmán when he escaped capture in 2014.

=== Cartel allies ===
In the late 2000s and early 2010s, the Sinaloa Cartel and Gulf Cartel were traditionally considered allies but as of 2021, this alliance has reportedly fizzled out as the two groups now battle each other in the state of Zacatecas with the Jalisco New Generation Cartel (CJNG) now siding with the Gulf to fight against Sinaloa. The CDS was battling La Linea, teamed with the CJNG, in Ciudad Juárez. But it was not until 2024, after the fall of Ismael "El Mayo" Zambada, allegedly caused by his former partners Los Chapitos, derived from that an internal dispute occurred within the cartel.

The Sinaloa Cartel has also made alliances with other gangs within the regions it operates. Domestically, the cartel's sub-groups and allies are known to consist of Los Ántrax (enforcer unit), Grupo Flechas, Los Cabrera (armed wing), Los Rusos (Zambada faction), Los Chapitos (Guzmán faction), Los Mexicles, Los Salazares (trafficking cell in Sonora), Sonora Cartel, Colima Cartel, Gente Nueva (armed wing), Juarez Cartel and La Barredora, while international alliances are thought to include Crips, Cártel del Noreste (in Zacatecas), La Nueva Familia Michoacana, Cárteles Unidos, La Familia Michoacana, Los Dámasos (armed wing), Independent Cartel of Nuevo León, Los Rastrojos, Paraguaná Cartel, Cachiros, Choneros, National Liberation Army, Herrera Organization, Fernando Pineda-Jimenez Organization, Mexican Mafia, Moroccan mafia, Serbian mafia, Kinahan Organised Crime Group, Independent Soldiers, Irish mob, Hells Angels (denied by HAMC), Chechen mafia, Albanian mafia, Romanian mafia, Cosa Nostra and the 'Ndrangheta.

The Sinaloa Federation has also formed alliances with two powerful Chinese triads, Sun Yee On and the 14K Triad, to acquire the precursor chemicals needed in creating highly-addictive synthetic drugs like methamphetamine, and now, likely fentanyl. Operatives like local gangs pick up the chemicals from dropoff points and ship them to hidden labs. The resulting products are shipped to the United States and many South American countries. Chinese transnational criminal groups also launder money at scale for the cartel. The Sinaloa Cartel also reportedly has a major presence in Colombia and has partnered with various paramilitary drug cartels such as the Clan del Golfo.

=== Alleged collusion with Mexican federal forces ===
In May 2009, the U.S. National Public Radio (NPR) aired multiple reports alleging that the Mexican federal police and military were working in collusion with the Sinaloa Cartel. In particular, the report claimed the government was helping the Sinaloa Cartel to take control of the Juarez Valley area and destroy other cartels, especially the Juarez Cartel. NPR's reporters interviewed dozens of officials and ordinary people for the journalistic investigation. One report quotes a former Juarez police commander who claimed the entire department was working for the Sinaloa Cartel and helping it to fight other groups. He also claimed that the Sinaloa Cartel had bribed the military. Also quoted was a Mexican reporter who claimed to have heard numerous times from the public that the military had been involved in murders. Another source in the story was the U.S. trial of Manuel Fierro-Mendez, an ex-Juarez police captain who admitted to working for the Sinaloa Cartel. He claimed that the Sinaloa Cartel influenced the Mexican government and military to gain control of the region. A DEA agent in the same trial alleged that Fierro-Mendez had contacts with a Mexican military officer. The report also alleged, with support from an anthropologist who studies drug trafficking, that data on the low arrest rate of Sinaloa Cartel members (compared to other groups) was evidence of favoritism on the part of the authorities. A Mexican official denied the allegation of favoritism, and a DEA agent and a political scientist also had alternate explanations for the arrest data. Another report detailed numerous indications of corruption and influence that the cartel has within the Mexican government.

There have also been multiple reports of senior members of the Sinaloa Cartel giving out bribes to high-ranking Mexican government officials. A witness testified at Joaquin "El Chapo" Guzmán's 2019 U.S. trial that the former president of Mexico, Enrique Peña Nieto, took a $100 million bribe from El Chapo. In early 2023, the former Secretary of Public Security in Mexico from 2006 to 2012, Genaro Garcia Luna, was convicted for accepting millions of dollars in cash bribes from the Sinaloa Cartel, in exchange for his resources as a public official. The Sinaloa Cartel often had access to Mexico's Federal Police, as well as having access to sensitive information to shake off law enforcement.

During his August 2025 guilty plea in a U.S. federal court in Brooklyn, cartel leader Ismael "El Mayo" Zambada gave input on the cartel's long history of paying bribes to Mexican police and military commanders, with payments going as far back as to the time the Sinaloa Cartel was starting.

According to federal court documents in Manhattan, Gerardo Mérida Sánchez—a former public security official in the Mexican state of Sinaloa—is accused of teaming up with leaders of the Sinaloa cartel to sneak large amounts of drugs into the United States. The indictment says he took more than $100,000 a month in bribes from Los Chapitos to protect the cartel's smuggling routes into the U.S. He was arrested in Arizona on May 11 and then transferred to New York. This case shows how drug production and trafficking networks in Mexico play a role in supplying a large share of the illegal drugs that end up being used in the United States.

=== Alleged collusion with U.S. federal forces ===
In 2012, Newsweek reported on allegations from an anonymous former Sinaloa member turned informant and former DEA agents that alleged that Joaquín Guzmán's legal adviser, Humberto Loya-Castro, had become a key informant for the DEA. Loya-Castro had become an official informant of the DEA in 2005 but was already providing vital information on rival cartels since the 1990s; such intel was instrumental to the takedown of the Tijuana Cartel, the Sinaloa cartel's main rival, as well as the death of Arturo Beltrán Leyva, who led a splinter group from the Sinaloa cartel. Such information ensured Loya-Castro was immune from prosecution while also keeping the DEA concentrated on Sinaloa's rivals and away from their leadership. Such allegations were confirmed by court documents obtained by El Universal during their investigation of collaboration with top officials from the Sinaloa cartel. According to court documents, the DEA had struck agreements with the cartel's leadership that would ensure that they would be immune from extradition and prosecution in the U.S. and would avoid disrupting the cartel's drug operations in exchange for intelligence that could be used against other drug cartels.

Statements from a Mexican diplomat, which were revealed from leaked emails from the Stratfor leak in 2012, appeared to imply the belief amongst Mexican officials that U.S. officials were assisting the Sinaloa cartel's drug smuggling efforts into the U.S. and were protecting the cartel while attacking its rivals in an attempt to lower violence between Mexican drug cartels; this was backed up by information provided by a Mexican foreign agent, codenamed MX1. The allegation that U.S. officials were controlling the drug trade through Mexico was corroborated by the former spokesman of the State of Chihuahua, Guillermo Terrazas Villanueva.

In March 2015, BBC TV program This World broadcast an episode entitled "Secrets of Mexico's Drug War" which reported on the U.S. government's Bureau of Alcohol, Tobacco, Firearms and Explosives' Operation Fast and Furious which had allowed licensed firearms dealers to sell weapons to illegal buyers acting on behalf of Mexican drug cartel leaders, in particular the Sinaloa Cartel. The BBC also reported on Vicente Zambada Niebla's claims of immunity from prosecution under a deal between the Mexican and U.S. governments and his claims that the Sinaloa Cartel's leaders had provided U.S. federal agents with information about rival Mexican drug gangs. In the same documentary it is shown that the U.S. Justice Department invoked national security reasons to prevent Humberto Loya Castro, the lawyer of the Sinaloa Syndicate, from being summoned as a witness to the trial against Vicente Zambada Niebla.

In February 2026, the U.S. State Department said it would pay up to $10 million for information leading to the arrests or convictions of two brothers identified as leaders of the Sinaloa cartel in the state of Baja California.

== Market ==
The cartel is primarily involved in the smuggling and distribution of South American (primarily Colombian) cocaine, Mexican cannabis (marijuana), methamphetamine and fentanyl, as well as Mexican and Southeast Asian heroin into the United States. However, much of the cannabis (marijuana) that is now cultivated and dealt by the cartel is being illegally grown in remote areas of California within the U.S. In recent times, the cartel has also moved further away from smuggling MDMA and even heroin, while increasing the smuggling of cocaine, fentanyl, and methamphetamine. The majority of high-value "hard" drugs are smuggled into the U.S. through legal ports of entry (border crossings), according to the DEA and various sources. They have been known to frequently use American citizens as mules, many of whom have drugs stuffed in passenger vehicles or tractor-trailers. Some of these are what are known as "trap cars", which are equipped with sophisticated mechanistic designs that reveal stash spots for drugs only when certain functions of the vehicle are manually performed simultaneously or in sequence. The cartel has also recently increased their migrant smuggling operations in border regions.

=== Cocaine ===
During the 2000s and possibly still today, it is believed that a group known as the Herrera Organization would transport multi-ton quantities of cocaine from South America to Guatemala on behalf of the Sinaloa Cartel. From there it is smuggled north to Mexico and later into the U.S. A very large percentage of the cocaine that gets trafficked through Mexico presumably comes through Guatemala first, with the most common estimate being about 600,000–800,000 pounds (300–400 short tons) a year arriving in Guatemala. Other shipments of South American cocaine are believed to originate directly from Cali and Medellín drug-trafficking groups in Colombia, from which the Sinaloa Cartel then handles transportation across the U.S. border to distribution cells in Arizona, California, Illinois, Texas, New York City, and Washington state. Since Colombia is still the biggest producer of cocaine in the world, the Sinaloa Cartel is a major player in the global cocaine trade operating within Colombia where it helps finance and support several of Colombia's local paramilitary drug-trafficking groups such as the left-wing National Liberation Army, dissidents of FARC and Colombia's current largest drug cartel and right-wing paramilitary group; the Clan del Golfo. The Sinaloa organization also now participates directly in coca cultivation and production in Colombia. Nearly 85% of Colombia's coca is grown within just five departments in the nation. These are likely the same five departments in Colombia in which the CDS and CJNG rivalry has been detected, which has reportedly led to the displacement of thousands of Colombian citizens just in early 2021. The presence of Mexican cartel groups in Colombia directly coincides with places that are more abundant with coca crops, or with strategic drug trafficking routes: the Pacific coast of Nariño, Catatumbo, Bajo Cauca in Antioquia, Norte del Cauca, and Magdalena.

Although Colombia, Bolivia and Peru have traditionally been the most notable South American countries in the cocaine trade, in recent times; Venezuela as well as Ecuador have stepped up their involvement in the trade, with the Venezuelan organization Cartel of the Suns posing concern to authorities abroad, as well as the increasing size of recent cocaine seizures in Ecuador. In August 2021, a single multi-ton cocaine shipment was seized off the coast of Ecuador causing a string of killings in the aftermath. The CDS is said to have a longstanding partnership with one of Ecuador's largest and most powerful criminal groups; The Choneros, who are based in the Pacific coast beach town of Manta, although they get their name from the western city of Chone. Since 2011, they have evolved to become one of the Ecuador's fiercest prison gangs due to the leader being incarcerated for nearly 8 years. This caused most of the organization's activities to be controlled and influenced directly from prison where the gang continued to recruit new members. They reportedly engage in micro-trafficking, contract killing, extortion and contraband smuggling. However, recently smaller gangs have begun to target the Choneros, and the organization has also fallen subject to the phenomenon of infighting within the gang and its derivative groups. According to the Washington Post, the Choneros are said to use their connections to rapidly move cocaine from the Colombian border to the Ecuadorian port of Guayaquil. Ecuador's purported 2021 "spiral" into increased rates of crime and drug violence supposedly can be traced back to 28 December 2020, when Jorge Luis Zambrano González (alias Rasquiña), leader of the gang was assassinated in a shopping mall cafeteria in Manta. The country's overcrowded prison system and the COVID-19 pandemic have apparently dominated much of the government's attention and focus recently, thus allowing the gang to more easily grow and consolidate power. The growing of the organization, as well as the killing of Rasquiña, and the increasing importance of Ecuador in the illegal cocaine trade, have given way to the recent crime waves in the region.

In August 2025, Ismael "El Mayo" Zambada acknowledged how the cartel built relationships with Colombian cocaine producers and also oversaw the importation of cocaine to Mexico by boat and plane.

=== Opioids (heroin and fentanyl) ===
It also currently deals in the fentanyl trade to a large extent, distributing both raw fentanyl powder as well as counterfeit "M30" pills designed to look like authentic oxycodone but which are, in fact, just pressed with fentanyl or other chemicals. The Sinaloa Cartel is a major player in the global cocaine trade. Similarly to methamphetamine, raw fentanyl production and distribution is incredibly profitable. Fentanyl is cheap to produce since it is entirely synthetic and can be clandestinely manufactured since, unlike cannabis (marijuana), opium/heroin, and coca, it requires no farming, cultivation, sunlight, or irrigation. Most of the precursors required to synthesize fentanyl and its analogues come from China where it is then processed into actual fentanyl by criminal organizations in Mexico. Fentanyl is chemically classified as a phenylpiperidine in its molecular structure, unlike the more traditional morphinan poppy-derived opiates such as codeine, morphine and even the closely related hydrocodone and heroin (diacetylmorphine). In the coastal city of Mazatlán, it reportedly takes as little as eight days for the precursor chemicals to move from a Pacific Ocean delivery to hidden cartel labs, then north across the U.S. border.

According to a 2019 DEA report, it is "estimated that each fentanyl pill costs only $1 to produce. It can be resold in the U.S. for at least 10 times as much." The cartel also manufactures and traffics heroin, a semisynthetic morphinan compound made from the Opium poppy (Papaver somniferum), which is now typically mixed with fentanyl to very cheaply increase its strength. Much of the heroin smuggled, particularly by the Sinaloa Cartel is made in "The Golden Triangle", a region in Mexico overlapping parts of the states of Sinaloa, Durango, and Chihuahua where opium and cannabis (marijuana) have historically been cultivated. Local state and government crackdowns on these farms, however, have pushed much of the opioid market in the direction of synthetics like fentanyl, which can be made far more covertly. In recent times, fentanyl in Mexico has sometimes, haphazardly been referred to as "Mexican oxy" or even "synthetic heroin".

The northern regions of Baja California, Sinaloa and Sonora have also been dubbed by some media outlets as the "Golden Triangle for fentanyl production and transferring", as both a distinction from and comparison to the classic opium farming region further south. In this northern regional area of illicit production, several important cities in its production and trade, such as Culiacán, Tijuana, Ensenada and San Luis Río Colorado consistently see the highest amount of law enforcement seizures for fentanyl, typically in kilograms (powder) or pressed pills. This has also subsequently led to the border city of San Diego reportedly becoming the 'epicenter for fentanyl trafficking in America' in mid-2022 due to its proximity to the border, according to local news reports. In San Diego County, the amount of fentanyl intercepted by U.S. Customs and Border Protection rose from 1,599 pounds (725 kg) in 2019 to more than 6,700 pounds (3,000 kg) in 2021. The cartel has also been known to use 'blind mules', particularly for the smuggling and transporting of fentanyl into and throughout the U.S., oftentimes with the mules not even knowing what they're trafficking. Many of these mules are American citizens, which helps ease the smuggling process, usually through the ports of entry back into the U.S. Mules are typically paid several thousand dollars to transport what usually amounts to millions of dollars worth of narcotics at a time. Tijuana has now also begun to develop its own problems with fentanyl use and addiction, despite this having mostly been a U.S. and Canadian phenomenon.

==== Multicolored rainbow fentanyl ====
Due to the cartel's past and current operations of pressing fentanyl into blue counterfeit "oxycodone (lookalike) pills", which have led to tens of thousands of accidental overdose deaths in the U.S. yearly, the Federation has reportedly responded by making multicolored fentanyl pills, so that customers know they are counterfeit and likely fentanyl rather than a controlled dose of the more sought-after drug oxycodone. They have also begun coloring the fentanyl powder in different colors so that dealers in the U.S. don't accidentally or intentionally mix in fentanyl powder with other white powdered substances like cocaine. Although the DEA originally claimed that these multicolored pills and powders were designed specifically to be marketed to children, these claims have been denied by operatives of the cartel, according to Business Insider and other sources. Operatives of the cartel have reportedly claimed that their intention was the 'opposite of that' and it was actually meant to distinguish them from real pharmaceuticals.

=== Cannabis (marijuana) ===
Although the Sinaloa Cartel has traditionally grown and cultivated cannabis (marijuana) locally in the original "Golden Triangle" region of Mexico, the cartel as well as other modern Mexican cartels have, in recent times, set up large cannabis (marijuana) growing operations in the remote forests and deserts of California where they reportedly have stolen millions of gallons of water for these illegal grows. In the summer of 2021, this apparently led to Los Angeles County's largest cannabis (marijuana) bust in its history. They discovered and dismantled 70 to 80 "hoop house" style green houses in the open desert and recovered thousands of pounds of cannabis (marijuana) which used water diverted or "hogged" from nearby alfalfa, carrot and potato farms. These grows can supposedly yield three to five harvests a year.

According to the RAND Corporation in 2010 it wasn't unrealistic to presume that "at least 50 percent" of the cannabis (marijuana) consumed in the United States was produced in Mexico. However, in the subsequent years after this the U.S.'s gradual moves towards recreational legalization in many states, as well as the superior quality of American-grown cannabis (marijuana) significantly began to cut down on the profits of cartels in Mexico. Despite this however, groups producing cannabis (marijuana) in Mexico still have been transferring product to states on the U.S. side which still have not legalized.

The legitimate cash-heavy business of local, fully legal cannabis (marijuana) shops can also prove beneficial for the cartel's money laundering activities. Factions like the Chapitos have already gotten into "branding" of cannabis (marijuana) products and investing in production as well as lobbying certain politicians for legalization. Currently, Culiacán's best-known brand is called "Star Kush". Its logo has an astronaut eating a slice of pizza; the pizza used by the cartel as a reference to "La Chapisa", the people working for Guzmán and his sons. The astronaut sits on top of a huge tomato due to Culiacán's role in being Mexico's biggest tomato exporter. Local producers of cannabis (marijuana) are financed by the Sinaloa organization to "make the best product" but are only allowed to sell it back to the cartel for their dispensaries.

=== Methamphetamine ===
Although likely not as prolific in methamphetamine cooking as the CJNG, the Sinaloa Cartel still has major methamphetamine operations throughout North America, which currently includes Mexico itself due to the now ubiquitous use of meth in the country; with regions like Guanajuato reportedly seeing a 2,400% increase in meth use from 2010 to 2020 roughly. Reportedly in 2010, out of every 100 people who used drugs in Guanajuato, only about two (2%) used crystal meth. While at the end of 2020, this figure increased to almost 50%, with usage rates for drugs like cannabis (marijuana) actually decreasing among users. The current rate of production and sale of methamphetamine in Mexico is now also a result of the so-called "new era" of fully-synthetic drug manufacturing and trafficking. Methamphetamine, being another fully synthetic compound (like fentanyl), also means that it doesn't require farming, cultivation, and other related resources like those needed for the production of cannabis (marijuana), cocaine, and heroin. It also "packs tighter" (see: Iron law of prohibition) than certain other drugs when smuggling due to its high potency relative to its weight.

According to a 2019 RAND Corporation study, 50% of global record seizures of the drug in 2018 were in North America. The U.S. market for the drug (as of 2021) may be worth an upwards of $50 billion; four times as much as the reported $13 billion market the U.S. had for methamphetamine in 2010. Along with North America, the world's other big regions of methamphetamine consumption are Southeast Asia and Oceania; mainly Australia and to a lesser extent, New Zealand. Initially when Mexican cartels like Sinaloa first moved into the Netherlands to set up shop around 2015 for their new drug manufacturing operations. The cartel, however, eventually convinced many of these groups to move away from MDMA synthesis and try to produce methamphetamine instead due to the potential for much higher profits.

Similarly to fentanyl, much of meth's industrial-grade precursors sourced from China or India, as well as Germany, arrive in Mexico at ports like Manzanillo, which has caused notable increases of violence in the small coastal state of Colima, as well as in strategic synthetic drug trafficking regions further north like Baja California and Zacatecas. Along with the state's Pacific Ocean chemical shipments at major ports Federal Highway 15 acts as a south-to-north thoroughfare, cutting from the port city of Mazatlán, through Sinaloa. This transit system allows the Sinaloa Cartel to transport precursor chemicals and the finished product across the northern border with passenger vehicles by far being the most common method for smuggling through the ports of entry. This has led to the state of Sinaloa essentially dominating the manufacturing of synthetic illegal drugs in Mexico.

It was initially during the 1980s that Mexican drug manufacturers began bringing methamphetamine north across the border, and newer forms that could be smoked were then introduced. During 2019 in the US, the Centers for Disease Control (CDC) recorded 16,167 methamphetamine overdose deaths, up from 3,627 overdoses related to the drug in 2013. Of the lethal meth overdoses registered in 2019, 52 of them occurred in New Hampshire, which is what caught the DEA's attention in regards to fake "Adderall" pills. Greatest use of the drug has traditionally been seen in the American Southwest, West, Northwest Inland, and in the rural Midwest. It was around 2005 when Mexican cartels such as the CDS began to take over almost complete control of the methamphetamine market in the U.S.; largely due to U.S. lawmakers passing the Combat Methamphetamine Epidemic Act, which greatly limited access to over-the-counter cold medicines that contain ephedrine and pseudoephedrine.

Purportedly, a larger percentage of Mexican methamphetamine is now made from entirely synthetic precursors instead of the natural compound ephedrine, or even the closely related pseudoephedrine, due to the country's restrictions on these precursor chemicals starting around 2007 (two years after the U.S.'s restrictions). Much of the modern methamphetamine circulating in North America from Mexican cartels like Sinaloa therefore now mostly consists of a half-and-half (racemic) or at times; uneven mixture of both the L-methamphetamine isomer (which is less dopaminergic and has more physical side effects) alongside the more desirable and potent D-methamphetamine (dextrorotatory) isomer. This is because methods for synthesizing methamphetamine without using ephedrine or pseudoephedrine, such as the alternative P2P reduction method; tends to yield a racemic (50:50) mixture of both isomers (specifically called enantiomers), rather than just pure d-methamphetamine which is observed in pseudoephedrine-based syntheses.

P2P (phenyl-2-propanone) is usually obtained from phenylacetic acid and acetic anhydride, with phenylacetic acid possibly arising from benzaldehyde, benzylcyanide, or benzylchloride. Methylamine is crucial to all such methods, and is produced from the model airplane fuel nitromethane, or formaldehyde and ammonium chloride, or methyl iodide with hexamine. This was once the preferred method of production by American motorcycle gangs in California, until DEA restrictions on the precursor chemicals made the process difficult. This method can involve the use of mercuric chloride and leaves behind mercury and lead environmental wastes.

== Impact ==
=== Mexico and Latin America ===
The cartel has been accused of infiltrating and corrupting various levels of government. There have been allegations of collusion between cartel members and politicians, law enforcement officials, and even elements of the military. Political corruption and the influence of drug cartels have been significant challenges for Mexico, affecting the credibility of its institutions. Cartel activities lead to the degradation of communities, with cities like Ciudad Juárez experiencing high levels of violence, kidnappings, and public decapitations.

The Sinaloa Cartel's operations extend beyond Mexico, with the organization involved in drug trafficking throughout Latin America. The evolution of trafficking routes from Colombian cartels to Mexican drug trafficking organizations (DTOs) shifted the dynamics, impacting Latin American territories. Specifically, the competition between Colombian cartels and Mexican DTOs, as well as internal competition among Mexican groups, contributed to a surge in violence over the past few decades. Historically, Colombian cartels dominated the cocaine trade, particularly during the 1970s and 1980s. However, changes in the global cocaine market, including increased demand in the United States, prompted a shift in production to Colombia. As a result, Mexican DTOs became crucial players in transporting cocaine from South America to the United States. The struggle for control over strategic trafficking routes and drug-producing regions led to territorial disputes, resulting in increased levels of violence, including confrontations with law enforcement and rival cartels.

The decline of Colombian cartels, partly due to law enforcement efforts and internal conflicts, created a power vacuum in the drug trade. Mexican DTOs capitalized on this vacuum and expanded their operations, leading to increased competition not only with Colombian cartels but also among themselves.

=== International ===
The influx of drugs, particularly narcotics, from Mexican cartels into the United States contributes to the rising drug epidemic, addiction rates, and associated public health concerns. The 1990s and 2000s saw the emergence of the opioid epidemic, driven initially by the overprescription of opioid painkillers, creating a lucrative market that Mexican cartels exploited.

The violence perpetrated by drug cartels in Mexico directly spills over into U.S. border regions. Incidents such as shootouts, abductions, and turf wars between rival cartels can extend beyond the Mexican side of the border, causing an escalation of violence in U.S. communities. U.S. Law enforcement agencies in border states face increased pressure to combat drug trafficking and related criminal activities, since police and other authorities must contend with the challenges posed by transnational criminal organizations operating on both sides of the border, stretching their resources and capabilities.

=== In popular culture ===
- The Sinaloa Cartel has, in both recent and past times, most often been the primary drug cartel that is associated with narcoculture in Mexico.
- The organization has become the subject of several documentaries, such as Cartel Land, Locked Up Abroad, The Shabu Trap, Clandestino, and several others. The cartel is also frequently reported on and mentioned in Vice News articles and documentaries. In December 2020, part of the cartel's illicit fentanyl operations were covered by National Geographic's Mariana van Zeller in a series she hosts called Trafficked.
- The best-known leader of the Sinaloa Cartel, Joaquín "El Chapo" Guzmán, has been portrayed in various films and series (such as the Univision series titled El Chapo), books (such as Confessions of a Cartel Hit Man) and music, most notoriously in Narcocorridos but also in American rap & hip hop songs. Many different kinds of merchandise and clothing sold in Mexico (particularly in Sinaloa) come bearing the number or logo "701" which comes from a Forbes listing in 2009 that ranked El Chapo as the 701st richest person in the world. Guzmán was also reportedly a fan of the narconovela known as La Reina del Sur which starred Mexican actress Kate del Castillo. Ms. del Castillo was first approached by Guzmán's lawyers in 2014, after she published an open letter to Guzmán in 2012 in which she expressed her sympathy and requested him to "traffic in love" instead of in drugs. Guzmán reached out again to del Castillo after his 2015 prison escape, and allegedly sought to cooperate with her in making a film about his life.

American actor Sean Penn heard about the connection with Mexican actress Kate del Castillo through a mutual acquaintance, and asked if he might come along to do an interview. Guzmán had a close call in early October 2015, several days after the meeting with Penn and Kate del Castillo. An unnamed Mexican official confirmed that the meeting helped authorities locate Guzmán, with cell phone interceptions and information from American authorities directing Mexican Marines to a ranch near Tamazula, Durango, in the Sierra Madre mountains in western Mexico. The raid on the ranch was met with heavy gunfire, and Guzmán was able to flee. The Attorney General of México declared that "El Chapo ran away through a gully and, although he was found by a helicopter, he was with two women and a girl and it was decided not to shoot". The two women were later revealed to be Guzmán's personal chefs, who had traveled with him to multiple safe houses. At one point, Guzmán reportedly carried a child on his arms "obscuring himself as a target".

- The origins of the Sinaloa Cartel, as well as its founding members, have also been portrayed in the Netflix crime drama series Narcos: Mexico.
- The Netflix series Queen of the South depicts fictional events dealing with the Sinaloa Cartel and its interconnections with the U.S. drug smuggling.
- Bruce Springsteen's song, "Sinaloa Cowboys", appears on his 1995 album The Ghost of Tom Joad. It tells the story of two Mexican brothers who become involved with the Sinaloa Cartel.
- In the Netflix series Ozark, the Sinaloa Cartel is portrayed as the main rival of the fictional Navarro cartel in an ongoing war.
- The Sinaloa Cartel are the main antagonists of 2018 film The Mule, starring Clint Eastwood (See: Leo Sharp). In this film, the cartel is led by Latón (Andy Garcia) and later by Gustavo (Clifton Collins Jr.), Latón's murderer.
- In Tom Clancy's 2011 novel Against All Enemies, the cartel is led by Ernesto "El Matador" Zuñiga, a brutal and powerful Mexican drug lord and rival of Jorge Rojas, the leader of the Juarez Cartel and the main antagonist of Against All Enemies.
- On Late Night with Seth Meyers (2022), John Oliver jokingly praised the quality of the Sinaloa Cartel's cocaine.

In addition to television and film, the cartel's former leader, "El Chapo", is a popular point of discussion in rap music, particularly growing notoriety after his 2014 capture after escaping prison in 2001. Several songs reference or depict El Chapo, often portraying him as a larger-than-life figure or focusing on his criminal activities. Most notable songs include:

- "El Chapo" by The Game featuring Skrillex: This song, released in 2015, directly references El Chapo in its title. The lyrics touch on themes of power, influence, and the dangerous lifestyle associated with drug cartels.
- "El Chapo" by Casino, Future, and Young Scooter: Also released in 2015, the song features the three artists rapping about themes related to the infamous Mexican drug lord Joaquín "El Chapo" Guzmán, referencing his criminal lifestyle, power, and influence.

== See also ==
- Sinaloa Cartel–Gulf Cartel conflict
- Battle of Culiacán (Culiacanazo)
- Illegal drug trade in Latin America
- Guadalajara Cartel
- Ismael Zambada García
- Jardines del Humaya
- Joaquín Guzmán Loera
- Leo Sharp
- Maritime drug trafficking in Latin America
- Mexican drug war
- Timeline of the Mexican drug war
- Facing El Chapo, a 2026 Netflix film about the event

== Sources ==
- Edmonds-Poli, Emily; Shirk, David A. (2009). Contemporary Mexican Politics. Rowman & Littlefield. ISBN 978-0742540491.
