= Otto Roberto Herrera García =

Guatemalan drug trafficker

- Born: 14 March 1965 (age 60); Guatemala
- Other names: El Compadre; Villagran; Francisco.
- Occupation: Drug trafficker
- Height: 5 ft 7 in (170 cm)

Notes
- Arrested in Colombia in June, 2007

Otto Roberto Herrera García (born 14 March 1965) is a Guatemalan national and career criminal, best known for turning Guatemala into a corridor for U.S.-bound cocaine.

After being captured in 2004 and receiving a prison sentence, he escaped in May 2005 from his jail in southern Mexico City while awaiting extradition to the United States. U.S. officials had called him one of the most-wanted drug traffickers in the world and offered a $2m (£1m) reward for information leading to his capture. The jail's warden, his deputy and 10 others were arrested for allegedly accepting bribes to facilitate his freedom. An arrest warrant was quickly put out by Interpol. Herrera García was arrested two years later in Bogotá, Colombia.

The U.S. Department of State reported that Otto Roberto Herrera García was the leader of a drug trafficking organization responsible for bringing more than 18 metric tons of cocaine from Colombia, through Central America and Mexico, into the United States since 1998. In 2001 alone, his organization moved approximately 12 metric tons of cocaine, and may have the ability to smuggle as much as 2 tons of cocaine into the United States each month. Herrera García's trafficking organization is very violent – known to have murdered suspected informants, including one who sustained 18 gunshot wounds.
