= Joaquín Guzmán López =

Mexican drug trafficker; son of El Chapo Guzman (born 1986)

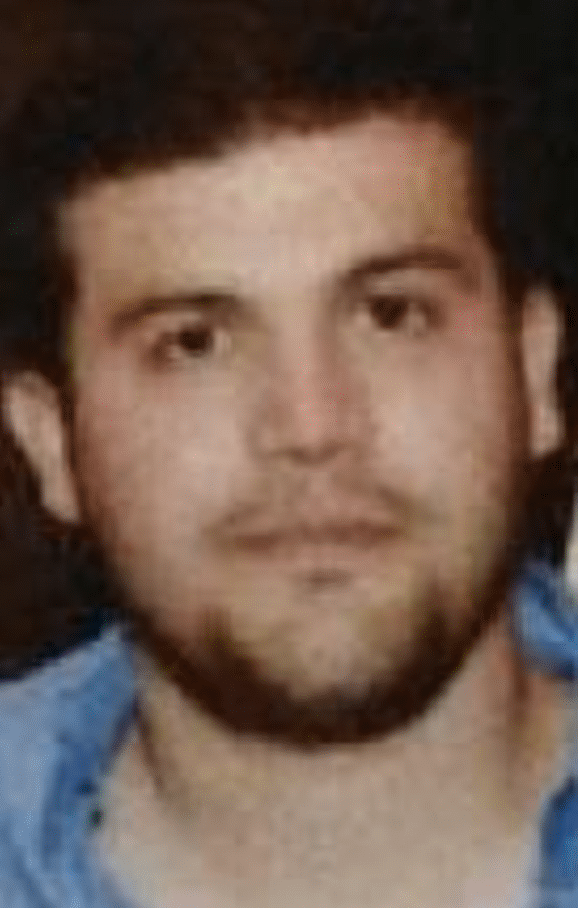
- Joaquin Guzman Lopez prior to 2021
- Born: 16 July 1986 (age 40); Culiacán, Sinaloa, Mexico
- Other name: "El Güero"
- Parent(s): Joaquín Guzmán Loera; Griselda López Pérez
- Status: In custody, entered guilty plea and is awaiting sentencing

Joaquín Guzmán López (born 16 July 1986), better known as El Güero Moreno, is a Mexican former drug trafficker and high-ranking member of the Sinaloa Cartel, a criminal organization based in Culiacán. He is the son of imprisoned drug trafficker Joaquín "El Chapo" Guzmán, considered Mexico's most notorious drug trafficker. Along with his brothers Ovidio Guzmán López, Iván Archivaldo Guzmán Salazar and Jesús Alfredo Guzmán Salazar, he led the faction known as Los Chapitos. Ovidio was arrested in Mexico on January 5, 2023, and extradited to U.S. on September 15 of same year.

On 25 July 2024, in El Paso, Texas, Guzmán was arrested by the U.S. authorities along with the well-known drug trafficker Ismael "El Mayo" Zambada. On 30 July, he pleaded not guilty to the charges, one of which carries a maximum sentence of death. Despite the terms of the extradition treaty between Mexico and U.S., he was eligible for the death penalty as he was arrested on U.S. soil. He was also charged with high treason by the Mexican government.

During the hearing on 21 October, it was confirmed that Guzmán and his brother, Ovidio, were negotiating plea deals and would be represented by same attorney. Their next hearing was scheduled for 7 January 2025. In May 2025, seventeen of their relatives entered the United States escorted by American authorities. In the same month, federal prosecutors confirmed they would not seek the death penalty if there were a conviction. His hearing before judge Sharon Johnson Coleman was scheduled for 1 December 2025, where he pleaded guilty to four criminal charges related to international drug trafficking and engaging in a criminal enterprise.
