= Ovidio Guzmán López =

Mexican drug lord (born 1990)

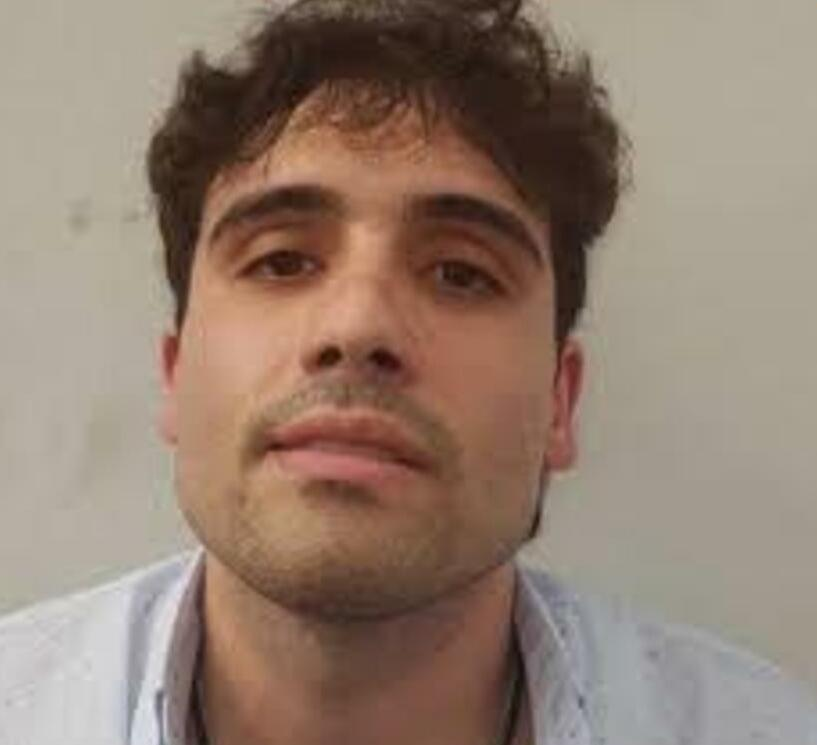
- Born: Ovidio Guzmán López; 29 March 1990 (age 36); Culiacán, Sinaloa, Mexico
- Other names: El Ratón; El Nuevo Ratón
- Organization: Sinaloa Cartel (suspected)
- Height: 5 ft 7 in (170 cm)
- Parent: Joaquín "El Chapo" Guzmán
- Relatives: Joaquín Guzmán López (brother), Iván Archivaldo Guzmán Salazar (half-brother), Jesús Alfredo Guzmán Salazar (half-brother)
- Status: Incarcerated
- Allegiance: Sinaloa Cartel
- Criminal charges: Conspiracy to Distribute 5 Kilograms or More of Cocaine, 500 Grams or More of Methamphetamine, and 1,000 Kilograms or More of Marijuana, Intending and Knowing that such substances will be Unlawfully Imported into the United States (Title 21 U.S.C. §§ 960(b)(1)(B)(ii), 960(b)(H), and 960(b)(1)(G))
- Penalty: 10 years (mandatory minimum) to life in prison
- Reward amount: US$5,000,000
- Capture status: Extradited to U.S.
- Wanted by: (Mexico) FGR (United States) FBI, HSI

Details
- Country: Mexico
- Date apprehended: 5 January 2023
- Imprisoned at: MCC Chicago (pretrial)

Ovidio Guzmán López (born 29 March 1990) is a Mexican former drug lord and high-ranking member of the Sinaloa Cartel, a criminal group based in the state of Sinaloa. He is the son of the drug lord Joaquín "El Chapo" Guzmán, once considered Mexico's most-wanted drug lord and the world's most-wanted criminal. Guzmán López was suspected of being a leader within a Sinaloa Cartel faction often referred to as Los Chapitos, Los Menores, and/or Los Juniors.

He was captured on 5 January 2023 and remanded to Federal Social Readaptation Center No. 1, until he was extradited to the US on 15 September 2023, awaiting trial. In July 2025, he pled guilty to four criminal charges related to international drug trafficking and engaging in a criminal enterprise.

== Early life ==
Guzmán López was born 29 March 1990 and is a son of Joaquín "El Chapo" Guzmán with his second wife. He was raised in Mexico City and spent four years of his education at a school run by the Legionaries of Christ. This biography states that Guzmán López's mother took him out of the school when the families of his classmates excluded him from a school trip.

A U.S. grand jury indictment alleges Guzmán López has been involved in his father's drug trafficking business since 2008, when he was a teenager.

== Career ==
The Office of Foreign Assets Control (OFAC) of the United States Department of the Treasury named him a "Key Lieutenant" of his father and the Sinaloa Cartel in a 2012 sanctions Foreign Narcotics Kingpin Designation Act ("Kingpin Act").

It is widely reported that Guzmán López took on a prominent role of the Sinaloa Cartel after his father's arrest. In 2019, the Associated Press reported that he leads the cartel along with his brothers Iván Archivaldo Guzmán, Jesús Alfredo Guzmán, and Ismael "El Mayo" Zambada.

In July 2017, the United States Attorney for the District of Columbia empaneled a grand jury that formally indicted both Ovidio Guzmán López and his brother Joaquín Guzmán López on charges of participating in a conspiracy to traffic cocaine, methamphetamine and marijuana since 2008. The sealed indictment was filed 2 April 2018.

On 12 December 2018, the indictment was unsealed for the limited purpose of disclosure in an extradition proceeding pursuant to the Jencks Act. Judge Rudolph Contreras ordered the full unsealing of the indictment on 13 February 2019.

=== 2019 capture and release ===
On 17 October 2019, members of the National Guard briefly arrested Ovidio Guzmán López in Culiacán, Sinaloa, setting off several gun battles in the city. Heavily armed cartel gunmen (numbering over 600) threatened mass civilian deaths, including an attack to the apartment complex housing the relatives of the local military personnel. Hours later, Ovidio Guzmán was freed, with President Andrés Manuel López Obrador saying he supported the decision in order to "prevent more bloodshed". López Obrador later said he ordered the release to prevent the killing of 200 people.

On 8 May 2020, Santiago Nieto, head of Mexico's Financial Intelligence Unit (UIF), confirmed that the Government of Mexico froze Ovidio Guzmán's assets, stating, "We have frozen the accounts of Ovidio and of 330 people linked to the cartel and have filed a complaint with the Prosecutor's Office. We have also found irregularities."

=== 2023 recapture ===
On 5 January 2023, the authorities arrested Guzmán López in the Jesús María district of Culiacán. The arrest was credited to a joint intelligence effort between Mexico and the US military named Operation Mongoose Azteca. US Intelligence spent months intercepting communications between members of the Cartel. Mexico authorities were able to use that information to locate the movements of Ovidio. According to eyewitness accounts, Guzmán López had a family party the evening before he was arrested. The military executed a pre-dawn raid on Guzmán López's residence that used a helicopter and convoy of ground vehicles and apprehended him within 10 hours of entry.

Reports of his arrest were later confirmed by Defense Secretary Luis Cresencio Sandoval, who stated that personnel from the Army, National Guard, Secretariat of National Defense and Secretariat of the Navy had captured him and also managed to successfully transport him to Mexico City, where he was then taken to offices of the Attorney General's organized crime special prosecutor.

The Air Force then flew Guzmán López by helicopter to the Federal Social Readaptation Center No. 1 ("Altiplano"), a maximum security federal prison in Almoloya de Juárez, later that afternoon. An additional 17 suspected cartel members were also taken into custody in the initial operation.

In a press conference, Foreign Secretary Marcelo Ebrard confirmed that there was an extradition request for Guzmán López to face trial in the United States, but Ebrard noted that he was also facing criminal charges in Mexico. The day after his arrest, a federal judge placed Guzmán López under a 60-day preventive detention to allow U.S. authorities to formally petition for his extradition.

==== Violence in Sinaloa and Sonora ====
Following the arrest, the U.S. Consulate in Hermosillo shared that it had received reports of gunfire, roadblocks, and fires throughout the cities of Culiacán, Los Mochis, and Guasave. The Consulate reiterated the United States Department of State's highest level of travel advisory cautioning against travel to Sinaloa. Sinaloa Governor Rubén Rocha Moya called for the public to shelter in place.

Unrest led to the closure of Culiacán International Airport as two planes at the airport—an airliner operated by Aeroméxico and a military aircraft—took gunfire. Shootouts were also reported on the runway. Aeroméxico diverted planes away from the international airports in Los Mochis and Mazatlán as well. Attacks on two trucks on Highway 15 in neighboring Sonora prompted Aeroméxico to also cancel flights from Ciudad Obregón International Airport. Regular service at all the affected airports was restored during the morning of 6 January.

Looting was reported in parts of Culiacán, and numerous businesses and banks announced temporary closures across the state. Journalists in the area reported multiple carjackings and demands for car keys.

Ten soldiers, 19 gang members, and one police officer were killed during the unrest. Among the victims were an infantry colonel and his four escorts, who were ambushed and killed by cartel members in Escuinapa, Sinaloa.

A report issued by the Secretariat of National Defense put the forces used in the operation at 3,586 soldiers. The Secretariat also claimed that in the course of the operation "four .50 caliber Barrett rifles, six 50 caliber machine guns, 26 long arms, 2 handguns, magazines, cartridges, various tactical equipment and 13 operational vehicles" were seized.

== Post-recapture ==
OFAC chart of relationships of persons and corporations designated for Kingpin Act international sanctions.

Following Guzmán López's capture, the U.S. Office of Foreign Assets Control applied sanctions pursuant to Executive Order 14059 against individuals and corporations of Sinaloa Cartel's networks supplying drug precursors for illicit manufacture of methamphetamine and fentanyl in so-called super-laboratories. These are defined by OFAC as "large-scale drug laboratories that produce 10 or more pounds of an illicit drug per production cycle". The targets included Luis Gerardo Flores Madrid, said to be a subordinate of Guzmán López.

A parallel press announcement by U.S. Secretary of State Antony Blinken described the sanctions as "part of a whole-of-government effort to disrupt and dismantle the transnational criminal organizations that facilitate the illicit supply of fentanyl and other narcotics".

On the same day as these announcements, the docket of the U.S. criminal case against Guzmán López was updated, with the trial attorney of the Narcotic and Dangerous Drug Section of the Department of Justice substituting as Government counsel of record.

On 28 February 2023, CBS News, Agence France-Presse, and Reuters quoted unnamed sources in the Mexican government as stating that the United States has formally requested Guzmán López's extradition.

On 15 September 2023, the government of Mexico extradited Guzmán López to the United States to face drug trafficking charges. U.S Attorney General Merrick Garland described the extradition as "the most recent step in the Justice Department's effort to attack every aspect of the cartel's operations".

On 23 July 2024, two days before the arrests of Ismael "El Mayo" Zambada and Ovidio's brother Joaquín Guzmán López, the Bureau of Prisons inmate records showed his status as released. The U.S. Department of Justice said that he remains in custody.

During the hearing on 21 October 2024, it was confirmed that Guzmán and his brother were negotiating plea deals and would be represented by the same attorney. Their next hearing was on 7 January 2025. In May 2025, seventeen of their relatives entered the United States escorted by American authorities. On 11 July 2025, Ovidio pleaded guilty in the Dirksen Federal Building of Chicago to two counts of counts of drug distribution, and two counts of participation in a continuing criminal enterprise. As of the same month, sentencing has not been publicly scheduled, as he is expected to cooperate with the U.S. government by providing information in hopes of avoiding a life sentence.

The Mexican government, led by President Claudia Sheinbaum, criticized the lack of coordination between the two countries, arguing that the arrests of Ovidio's brother and Zambada had triggered internal conflict among criminal groups. Jeffrey Lichtman, Ovidio's attorney, commented on the situation by referencing the 2021 release of General Salvador Cienfuegos, a former official accused of protecting criminal organizations, who was extradited to Mexico at its request and later exonerated.

== See also ==
- Mexican drug war
- Drug trafficking
