= Iván Archivaldo Guzmán Salazar =

Mexican fugitive tied to the Sinaloa Cartel; son of El Chapo Guzmán (born 1983)

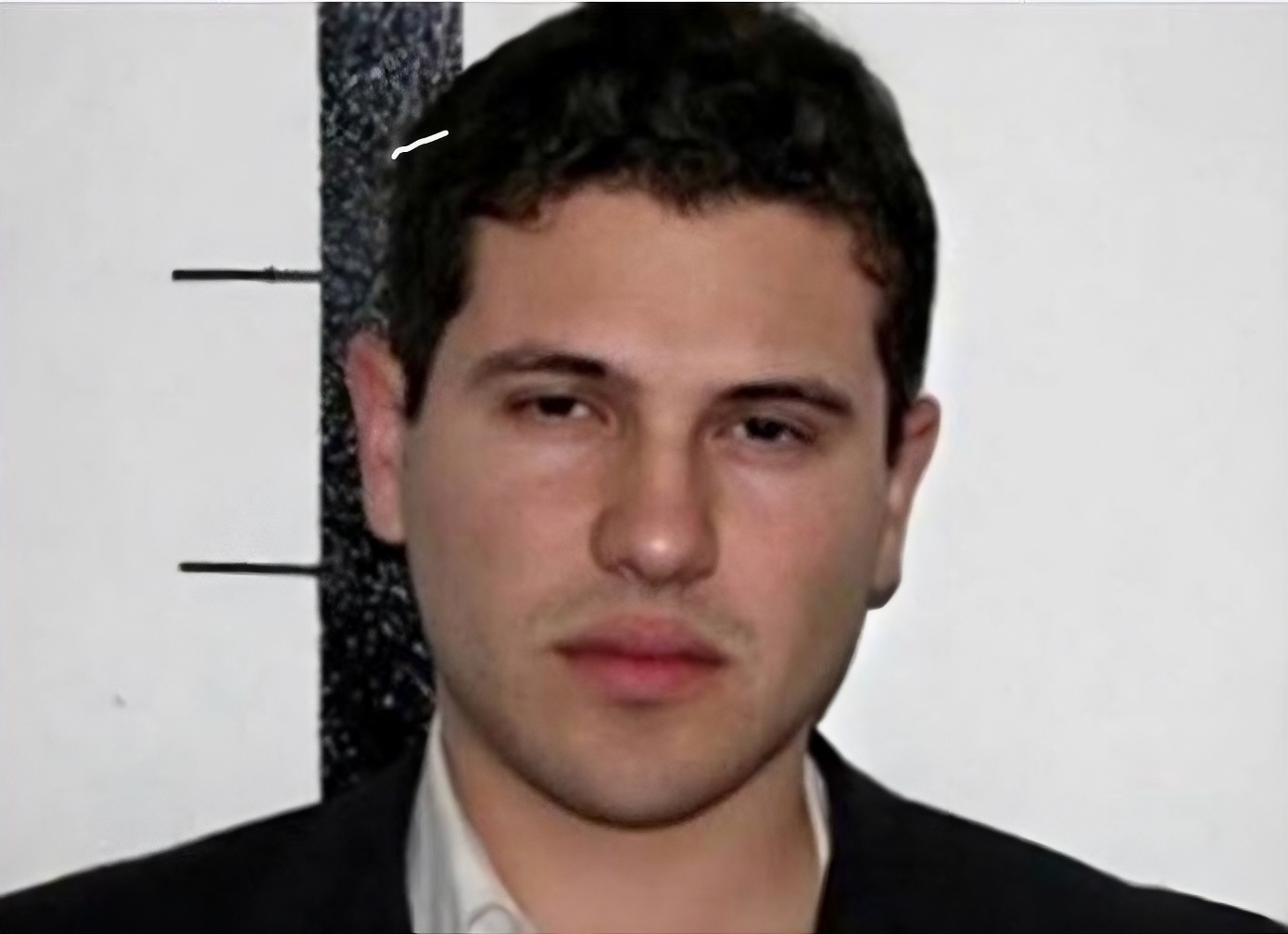
- 2005 Mugshot of Iván Archivaldo
- Born: 1983 (disputed)
- Other names: "Chapito" "Tocallo" "El Menor"
- Parent(s): Joaquín Guzmán Loera; Alejandrina Salazar Hernández
- Status: Wanted
- Wanted by: (Mexico) FGR (United States) DEA, HSI

A wanted poster by the US government soliciting tips to capture Iván Archivaldo Guzmán Salazar "El Chapito"

Iván Archivaldo Guzmán Salazar, also known by his alias "El Chapito" (English: 'Little Chapo'), is a Mexican drug lord, narcoterrorist, and current co-leader of the Sinaloa Cartel, along with Ismael Zambada Sicairos.

According to U.S. government sources and observers of the narcotics trade, Iván Archivaldo, his brother Jesús Alfredo Guzmán Salazar, and half-brothers Ovidio Guzmán López and Joaquín Guzmán López have taken over the faction of the cartel previously led by their father. They are commonly referred to as "Los Chapitos." Ovidio Guzmán López was apprehended on 5 January 2023 and extradited to the U.S., where he is now imprisoned on drug trafficking charges, while Joaquín Guzmán López was arrested on 25 July 2024 and is currently going through court procedures.

== Early life and family ==
There is conflicting information about Iván's date and place of birth. A June 2012 release by the Office of Foreign Assets Control of the United States Department of the Treasury (which placed both Chapito and his father on the Kingpin Act list) states his birthday as 2 October 1980. A 2019 report by Infobae claims his birthday is in October 1983. The United States Department of State on 16 December 2021 listed his date of birth as 15 August 1983 and place of birth as Zapopan, Jalisco. On 9 June 2025, the Office of Foreign Assets Control listed his place of birth as Durango, Durango. United States Immigration and Customs Enforcement lists his place of birth as Sinaloa, Mexico.

He was born to infamous Mexican drug lord Joaquín "El Chapo" Guzmán and his first spouse, Alejandrina Salazar Hernández. He has two half-siblings through his mother, Raúl and Ana Elizabeth Ramírez Salazar. According to Infobae, Iván Guzmán is a relative of trafficker Héctor Luis Palma Salazar (alias "El Güero" or "Whiteboy"), an associate of El Chapo dating to their time in the Guadalajara Cartel. The Guadalajara Cartel is the organization from which Palma, Guzmán, and Zambada García splintered to form the Sinaloa Cartel.

Iván's siblings in the Guzmán Salazar branch are Ana Elizabeth Salazar, Raúl Salazar Ramírez, and Jesús Alfredo Guzmán Salazar (alias "Alfredillo").

According to InSight Crime, the Guzmán Salazar brothers, Iván and Jesús, along with their half-brother, Ovidio Guzmán López, were introduced to the Sinaloa Cartel as teenagers by their father and his co-leader, Ismael "El Mayo" Zambada García.

== 2005 arrest and imprisonment ==
Multiple contemporary news reports state that in April 2004, Iván was involved in the murder of Canadian exchange student Kristen Deyell and her Mexican companion, César Augusto Pulido Mendoza. The case remained unsolved.

In February 2005, Zapopan Municipal Police Officers (ZMP) arrested Iván Archivaldo Guzmán Salazar, Jorge Ozuna Tovar, and Alfredo Gómez Díaz as they sat in their vehicle waiting for another carload of associates. Before Guzmán Salazar's arrest, ZMP had observed a man being thrown from a car. The ZMP pursued the vehicle and eventually detained five subjects, later identified as associates of Guzmán Salazar.

In early June 2005, El Chapo posted his US$55,000 bail bond, and Iván was released; federal police quickly re-arrested him. The government imprisoned Iván Archivaldo in Federal Social Readaptation Center No. 1 "La Palma" while he awaited trial on the charge of money laundering. According to a report by journalist Anabel Hernández, Iván Archivaldo requested that his father send him warmer clothes to deal with the cold in the prison. When El Chapo requested guards' help in smuggling contraband clothing, they raised their fees five-fold to $500,000. Later, El Chapo would have the guards captured, tortured, and murdered, then left their dismembered bodies on the outskirts of Mexico City International Airport.

In 2008, Iván Archivaldo Guzmán Salazar was found guilty of money laundering and sentenced to five years imprisonment. He successfully appealed the verdict, however, and he was released later that year.

== United States indictment ==
In 2012, the United States Department of the Treasury's Office of Foreign Assets Control designated Guzmán Salazar under the Foreign Narcotics Kingpin Designation Act, naming him a "lieutenant" of El Chapo Guzmán in the Sinaloa Cartel along with Ovidio Guzmán López.

In 2013, a grand jury in United States District Court for the Southern District of California indicted Sinaloa boss "El Mayo" Mario Zambada García, two of Zambada's sons, Ismael Zambada Sicairos (known as "Mayito Flaco") and Ismael Zambada-Imperial (known as "Mayito Gordo"), as well as Iván Archivaldo Guzmán Salazar. El Mayo was charged with violating the Continuing Criminal Enterprise Statute (also known as the "Kingpin Statute"); all of the defendants are charged with counts of conspiracy to distribute and import narcotics. The court unsealed the indictment and issued a warrant for Iván Archivaldo Guzmán Salazar's arrest on 25 July 2014.

Ismael Zambada-Imperial was arrested in Mexico in November 2014, then extradited in 2019. He pled guilty in 2021.

In April 2023, a grand jury in the United States District Court for the Northern District of Illinois indicted Iván Archivaldo Guzmán Salazar, along with his brother, Jesús Alfredo Guzmán Salazar, and half-brothers, Joaquín Guzmán López and Ovidio Guzmán López. All four were charged with various narcotics and arms-related offenses against the United States, including leading a large faction of the Sinaloa Cartel. This indictment alleged he controlled the smuggling of cocaine, heroin, methamphetamine, and fentanyl into the United States and that he was involved in various acts of violence, including a murder that took place in the United States.

== Kidnapping ==
On 15 August 2016, members of the Jalisco New Generation Cartel (CJNG) kidnapped Iván Archivaldo Guzmán Salazar, his brother, Jesús Alfredo Guzmán Salazar, and four other individuals. The kidnapping occurred in broad daylight in the exclusive restaurant La Leche in the bustling tourist area of Puerto Vallarta.

The following week, both the family of El Chapo Guzmán and the DEA confirmed that Alfredo, Iván, and the others had been released.

== After the imprisonment of El Chapo ==
Following the 2019 conviction of El Chapo Guzmán in the United States v. Guzmán case, the United States Department of State claims that Iván Archivaldo, Jesús Alfredo Guzmán Salazar, and half-brother Ovidio Guzmán López "have increased their power within the Sinaloa Cartel. They have expanded their enterprise with sophisticated fentanyl laboratories in Culiacán [...] and expanded drug smuggling utilizing maritime and air transportation in addition to smuggling tunnels and border crossings."

The U.S. State Department's Rewards for Justice Program offers a $10 million reward for information leading to the arrest and/or conviction of Iván Archivaldo Guzmán Salazar.

Iván Archivaldo was reportedly captured and arrested by Mexican Military personnel on the outskirts of Culiacán, Sinaloa, on the evening of 29 August 2024. These reports were later disproven by Mexican news outlets.
