= Jesús Alfredo Guzmán Salazar =

Mexican drug trafficker (born 1986)

Alfredo Guzmán
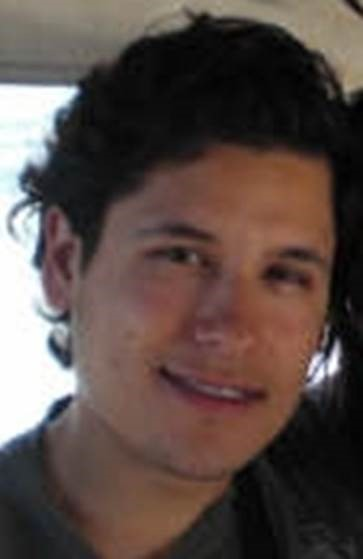
- An undated photo of Guzmán
- Born: Jesús Alfredo Guzmán Salazar; May 17, 1986 (age 40); Sinaloa, Mexico
- Other names: Alfredillo; El Chapito
- Occupation: Co-leader of the Sinaloa Cartel
- Years active: 2006–present
- Employer: Sinaloa Cartel
- Parent(s): Joaquín Guzmán Loera; Alejandrina María Salazar Hernández
- Relatives: Iván Archivaldo Guzmán Salazar (brother); Ovidio Guzmán López (brother); Édgar Guzmán López (brother); Joaquín Guzmán López (brother)
- Status: Fugitive
- Criminal charge: Drug trafficking
- Wanted by: (Mexico) FGR (United States) DEA, HSI

Jesús Alfredo Guzmán Salazar (born May 17, 1986) is a Mexican drug lord. He is the son of the imprisoned drug lord and former leader of the Sinaloa Cartel, Joaquín "El Chapo" Guzmán. On September 13, 2018, he was included in the United States Drug Enforcement Administration's top ten most wanted list.

== Biography ==
Guzmán was born in 1986 in Sinaloa, Mexico. He is the son of María Alejandrina Salazar Hernández, Joaquín "El Chapo" Guzmán's first wife, with whom he also had his brother Iván Archivaldo Guzmán Salazar, "El Chapito". He is known by his alias "Alfredillo" and is said to be in control of the Sinaloa Cartel, which his father also belonged to before he was captured by the police in 2016.

He reportedly routinely posts to multiple accounts on social media showing off exotic cars, expensive private jets, vacations, high-powered weapons and stacks of cash. Guzmán reportedly met actors Sean Penn and Kate del Castillo when the pair met El Chapo in 2015, with Penn stating he was handsome, lean, and smartly dressed with an expensive wristwatch.

Guzmán and his mother were sanctioned by the US Department of Treasury in 2012, due to their connection with the Sinaloa Cartel. He and three of his brothers are considered heir apparent in the case of El Chapo's removal from leadership. In 2025, Guzmán and his brother Iván Archivaldo Guzmán Salazar were sanctioned by the United States government and the subject of a $10 million reward for each under the Foreign Narcotics Kingpin Designation Act.

== Kidnapping ==
On August 15, 2016, Guzmán was kidnapped by alleged members of the Jalisco New Generation Cartel (CJNG), along with his brother Iván Archivaldo Guzmán Salazar and four other people. The kidnapping occurred at one in the morning on Monday, August 15, at the La Leche restaurant, located in one of the busiest areas of Puerto Vallarta.

On August 22, relatives of Joaquín Guzmán Loera and sources from the Drug Enforcement Administration (DEA) confirmed that "El Chapo"'s sons, along with the other four kidnapped individuals, had been released.
