= Clouthier =

Clouthier is a surname. Notable people with the surname include:

- Adolfo Clouthier (1909-?), Mexican athlete
- Hec Clouthier (born 1949), Canadian politician
- Manuel Clouthier (1934–1989), Mexican businessman and politician
- Manuel Clouthier Carrillo (born 1961), Mexican politician
- Tatiana Clouthier (born 1964), Mexican educator and politician
