= 6th federal electoral district of Sinaloa =

Federal electoral district of Mexico

Sinaloa's 6th
- Electoral district of the Chamber of Deputies of Mexico

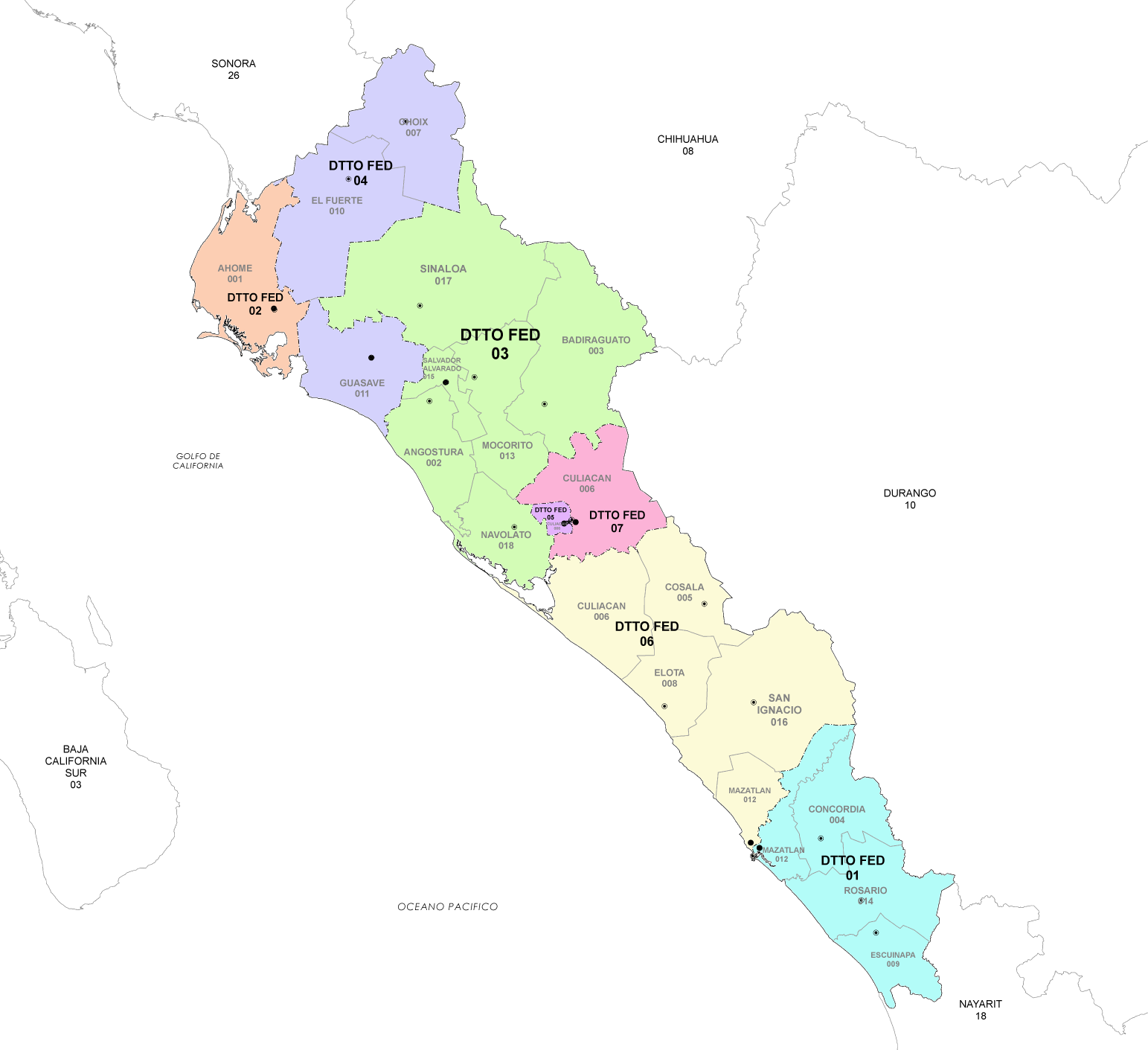
- 6th district since 2023

Incumbent
- Member: Olegaria Carrazco Macias
- Party: ▌Morena
- Congress: 66th (2024–2027)

District
- State: Sinaloa
- Head town: Mazatlán
- Coordinates: 23°13′N 106°25′W
- Covers: Cosalá, Culiacán (part), Elota, Mazatlán (part), San Ignacio
- PR region: First
- Precincts: 543
- Population: 434,330 (2020 census)

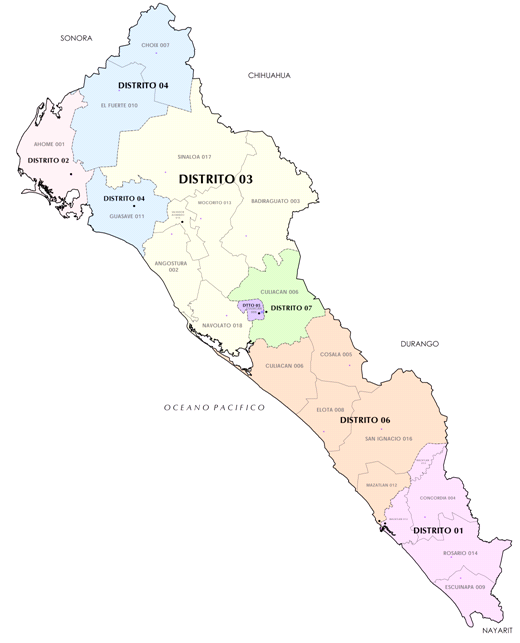
Sinaloa under the 2017–2022 districting scheme

The 6th federal electoral district of Sinaloa (Spanish: Distrito electoral federal 06 de Sinaloa) is one of the 300 electoral districts into which Mexico is divided for elections to the federal Chamber of Deputies and one of seven such districts in the state of Sinaloa.

It elects one deputy to the lower house of Congress for each three-year legislative session by means of the first-past-the-post system. Votes cast in the district also count towards the calculation of proportional representation ("plurinominal") deputies elected from the first region.

Suspended in 1930, (Note: An amendment to Article 52 of the Constitution in 1928 changed the original provision of "one deputy per 60,000 inhabitants" to "one deputy per 100,000"; as a result, the size of the Chamber of Deputies fell from 281 in the 1928 election to 171 in 1934.) the 6th district was re-established as part of the 1977 electoral reforms, which increased the number of single-member seats in the Chamber of Deputies from 196 to 300. Under that plan, Sinaloa's seat allocation rose from five to nine. The new districts were first contested in the 1979 legislative election.

The current member for the district, re-elected in the 2024 general election, is Olegaria Carrazco Macias of the National Regeneration Movement (Morena).

== District territory ==
Under the 2023 districting plan adopted by the National Electoral Institute (INE), which is to be used for the 2024, 2027 and 2030 federal elections, the sixth district comprises 543 electoral precincts (secciones electorales) across five of the state's municipalities:

- Cosalá, Elota and San Ignacio in their entirety, the southern portion of Culiacán, and the north-west portion of Mazatlán. (Note: Under the 2023 plan, the remainder of Culiacán is assigned to the 5th and 7th districts, while the remainder of Mazatlán belongs to the 1st district.)

The head town (cabecera distrital), where results from individual polling stations are gathered together and tallied, is the port city of Mazatlán. The district reported a population of 434,330 in the 2020 census.

== Previous districting schemes ==
Evolution of electoral district numbers
| | 1974 | 1978 | 1996 | 2005 | 2017 | 2023 |
|---|---|---|---|---|---|---|
| Sinaloa | 5 | 9 | 8 | 8 | 7 | 7 |
| Chamber of Deputies | 196 | 300 | | | | |

2017–2022

As in the 2023 plan, the 6th district covered Cosalá, Elota and San Ignacio in their entirety, together with southern Culiacán and north-western Mazatlán. The city of Mazatlán was the head town.

1996–2017

Under both the 1996 and 2005 plans, the 6th district comprised the entire state south of Culiacán – the municipalities of Cosalá, Elota, San Ignacio, Mazatlán, Concordia, Rosario and Escuinapa. Not included was the urban core of Mazatlán (albeit with slight changes in the dividing lines used in the two schemes), which made up the 8th district.

1978–1996

From 1978 to 1996, the re-established 6th district was located in the north of the state, covering the municipalities of Choix, El Fuerte, Sinaloa and rural portions of Ahome. The head town was at El Fuerte.

== Deputies returned to Congress ==
(Mexico) National parties
- Current
- PAN
- PRI
- PT
- PVEM
- MC
- Morena
- PAZ
- Somos
- Defunct or local only
- PLM
- PNR
- PRM
- PNM
- PP
- PPS
- PARM
- PFCRN
- CON
- PANAL
- PSD
- PES
- PES
- PRD

Sinaloa's 6th district
| Election | Deputy | Party | Term | Legislature |
|---|---|---|---|---|
| 1979 | Fortino Gómez Mac Hattón | Institutional Revolutionary Party | 1979–1982 | 51st Congress |
| 1982 | Juan Rodolfo López Monroy | Institutional Revolutionary Party | 1982–1985 | 52nd Congress |
| 1985 | Salvador Robles Quintero | Institutional Revolutionary Party | 1985–1988 | 53rd Congress |
| 1988 | María Eduwiges Vega Padilla | Institutional Revolutionary Party | 1988–1991 | 54th Congress |
| 1991 | Manuel de Jesús Valdez Sánchez | Institutional Revolutionary Party | 1991–1994 | 55th Congress |
| 1994 | Pablo Moreno Cota | Institutional Revolutionary Party | 1994–1997 | 56th Congress |
| 1997 | Rafael Oceguera Ramos | Institutional Revolutionary Party | 1997–2000 | 57th Congress |
| 2000 | José Jaime Barrón Fonseca | Institutional Revolutionary Party | 2000–2003 | 58th Congress |
| 2003 | Jorge Abel López Sánchez (Note: López Sánchez was elected for the seat but was never sworn in. He was replaced by his alternate, Vega Carlos, for the duration of his term.); Bernardo Vega Carlos (Note: On 16 March 2006, Vega Carlos declared himself an independent.) | Institutional Revolutionary Party Independent politician | 2003–2006 | 59th Congress |
| 2006 | Daniel Amador Gaxiola | Institutional Revolutionary Party | 2006–2009 | 60th Congress |
| 2009 | Germán Contreras García | Institutional Revolutionary Party | 2009–2012 | 61st Congress |
| 2012 | Francisca Elena Corrales Corrales | Institutional Revolutionary Party | 2012–2015 | 62nd Congress |
| 2015 | Germán Escobar Manjarrez | Institutional Revolutionary Party | 2015–2018 | 63rd Congress |
| 2018 | Olegaria Carrazco Macias | National Regeneration Movement | 2018–2021 | 64th Congress |
| 2021 | Olegaria Carrazco Macias | National Regeneration Movement | 2021–2024 | 65th Congress |
| 2024 | Olegaria Carrazco Macias | National Regeneration Movement | 2024–2027 | 66th Congress |

== Presidential elections ==
Sinaloa's 6th district
| Election | District won by | Party or coalition | % |
|---|---|---|---|
| 2018 | Andrés Manuel López Obrador | Juntos Haremos Historia | 59.7906 |
| 2024 | Claudia Sheinbaum Pardo | Sigamos Haciendo Historia | 63.6628 |
