= Jesús Antonio Valdés Palazuelos =

Mexican politician

Deputy for Sinaloa's 5th district
- In office 1 September 2012 – 31 August 2015
- Preceded by: Aarón Irizar López
- Succeeded by: Manuel Jesús Clouthier Carrillo

Member of the Congress of Sinaloa
- In office 2007–2010
- Preceded by: Eduardo Ortiz Hernández
- Succeeded by: José Cruz Loaiza Torres

Personal details
- Born: 13 December 1978 (age 47) Culiacán, Sinaloa, Mexico
- Party: PRI
- Occupation: Politician

Jesús Antonio Valdés Palazuelos (born 13 December 1978) is a Mexican politician previously affiliated with the Institutional Revolutionary Party (PRI). He served as a federal deputy in the 62nd Legislature of the Mexican Congress (2012 to 2015), representing Sinaloa's fifth district for the PRI.

Valdés Palazuelos unsuccessfully sought election as one of Sinaloa's senators in the 2024 Senate election, occupying the first place on the Ecologist Green Party of Mexico's two-name formula. The party came in third place with slightly over 9% of the vote.
