= 5th federal electoral district of Sinaloa =

Federal electoral district of Mexico

Sinaloa's 5th
- Electoral district of the Chamber of Deputies of Mexico

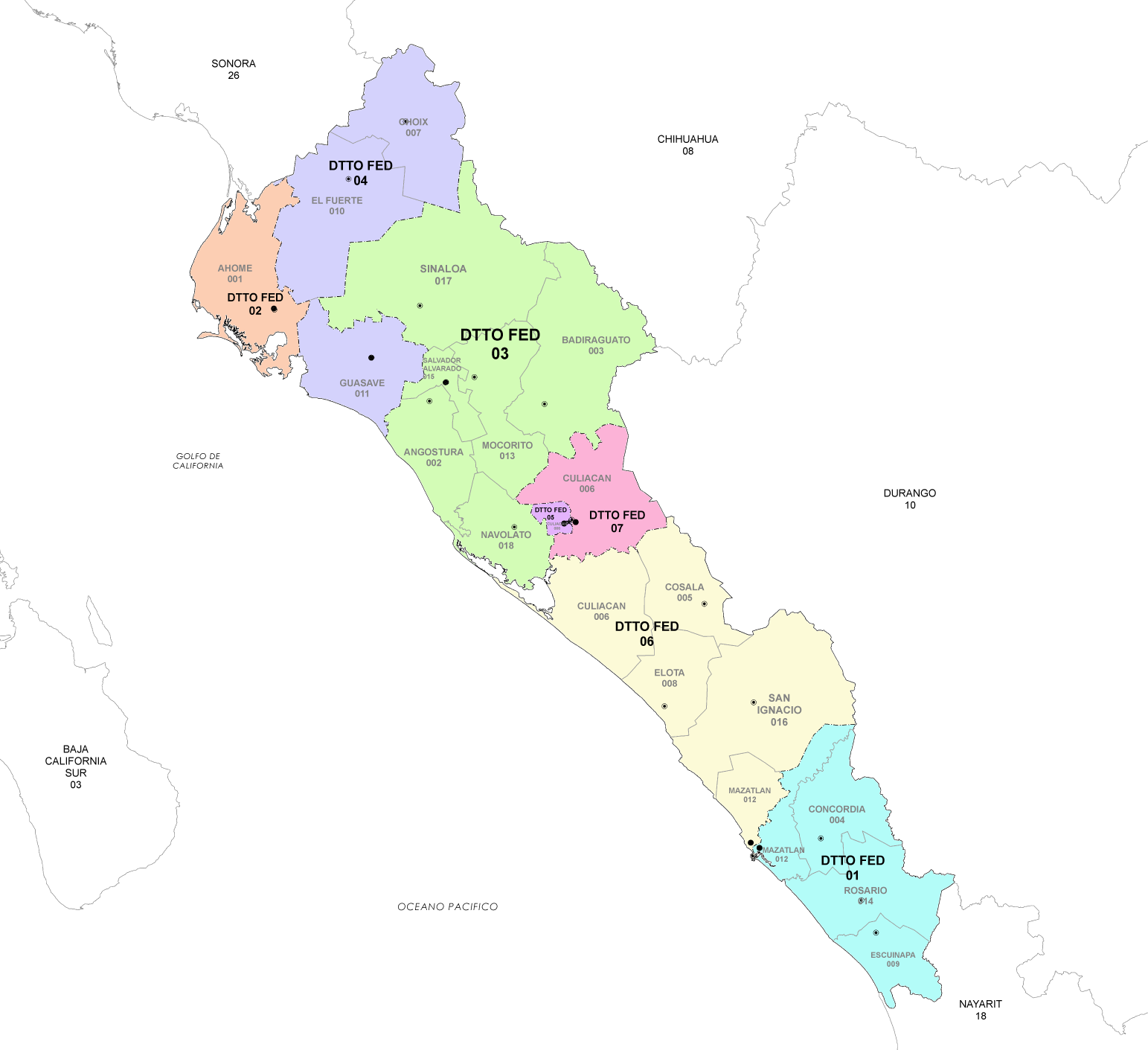
- 5th district since 2023

Incumbent
- Member: Jesús Ibarra Ramos
- Party: ▌Morena
- Congress: 66th (2024–2027)

District
- State: Sinaloa
- Head town: Culiacán Rosales
- Coordinates: 24°48′N 107°23′W
- Covers: Municipality of Culiacán (part)
- PR region: First
- Precincts: 373
- Population: 445,024 (2020 census)

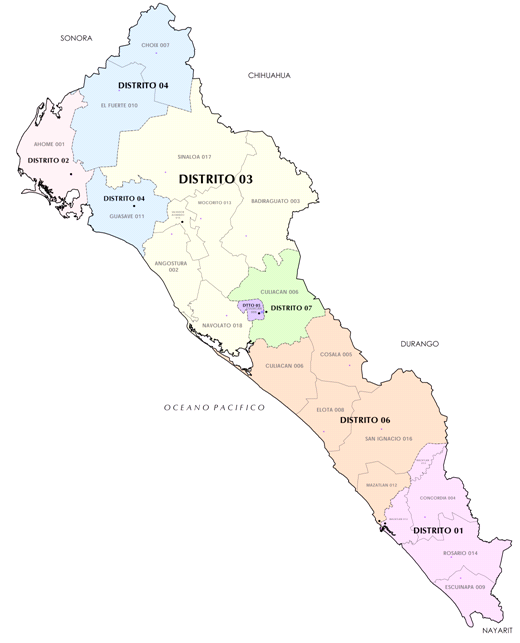
Sinaloa under the 2017–2022 districting scheme

The 5th federal electoral district of Sinaloa (Spanish: Distrito electoral federal 05 de Sinaloa) is one of the 300 electoral districts into which Mexico is divided for elections to the federal Chamber of Deputies and one of seven such districts in the state of Sinaloa.

It elects one deputy to the lower house of Congress for each three-year legislative session by means of the first-past-the-post system. Votes cast in the district also count towards the calculation of proportional representation ("plurinominal") deputies elected from the first region.

The current member for the district, elected in the 2024 general election, is Jesús Alfonso Ibarra Ramos of the National Regeneration Movement (Morena).

== District territory ==
Under the 2023 districting plan adopted by the National Electoral Institute (INE), which is to be used for the 2024, 2027 and 2030 federal elections, the fifth district comprises 373 electoral precincts (secciones electorales) in the urban core of the municipality of Culiacán. (Note: Under the 2023 plan, the remainder of Culiacán is assigned to the 6th and 7th districts.)

The head town (cabecera distrital), where results from individual polling stations are gathered together and tallied, is the state capital, Culiacán Rosales. The district reported a population of 445,024 in the 2020 census.

== Previous districting schemes ==
Evolution of electoral district numbers
	1974	1978	1996	2005	2017	2023
Sinaloa	5	9	8	8	7	7
Chamber of Deputies	196	300				

2017–2022

Under the 2017 plan, the 5th district comprised 359 precincts in the urban core of the municipality of Culiacán, with the state capital serving as the head town. (Note: Under the 2017 plan, the remainder of Culiacán was assigned to the 6th and 7th districts.)

1996–2017

Under both the 1996 and 2005 plans – albeit with slight adjustments to the dividing line with the 7th district – the 5th district comprised the northern portion of the municipality of Culiacán. The state capital served as the head town.

1978–1996

The districting scheme in force from 1978 to 1996 was the result of the 1977 electoral reforms, which increased the number of single-member seats in the Chamber of Deputies from 196 to 300. Under that plan, Sinaloa's seat allocation rose from five to nine. The 5th district covered parts of the port city of Mazatlán and of its surrounding municipality, (Note: Under the 1978 plan, the 4th district covered the remainder of Mazatlán.) together with the municipalities of Cosalá, Elota and San Ignacio.

== Deputies returned to Congress ==
(Mexico) National parties
- Current
- PAN
- PRI
- PT
- PVEM
- MC
- Morena
- PAZ
- Somos
- Defunct or local only
- PLM
- PNR
- PRM
- PNM
- PP
- PPS
- PARM
- PFCRN
- CON
- PANAL
- PSD
- PES
- PES
- PRD

Sinaloa's 5th district
Election	Deputy	Party	Term	Legislature
1916	Emiliano C. García		1916–1917	Constituent Congress of Querétaro
...
1979	Palemón Bojórquez Atondo	Institutional Revolutionary Party	1979–1982	51st Congress
1982	Rafael Oceguera Ramos	Institutional Revolutionary Party	1982–1985	52nd Congress
1985	José Ángel Pescador Osuna	Institutional Revolutionary Party	1985–1988	53rd Congress
1988	Martín Gavica Garduño	Institutional Revolutionary Party	1988–1991	54th Congress
1991	Jesús Arnoldo Millán Trujillo	Institutional Revolutionary Party	1991–1994	55th Congress
1994	Jorge Abel López Sánchez	Institutional Revolutionary Party	1994–1997	56th Congress
1997	Gustavo Adolfo Guerrero Ramos (Note: Guerrero Ramos resigned his seat on 12 August 1998 and was replaced by his alternate, Tamayo Morales, for the remainder of his term.); Martha Sofía Tamayo Morales	Institutional Revolutionary Party	1997–1998; 1998–2000	57th Congress
2000	Aarón Irízar López	Institutional Revolutionary Party	2000–2003	58th Congress
2003	Guadalupe de Jesús Vizcarra Calderón (Note: Vizcarra Calderón resigned his seat on 31 December 2004 and was replaced by his alternate, Moreno Ovalles, for the remainder of his term.); Irma Guadalupe Moreno Ovalles	Institutional Revolutionary Party	2003–2004; 2005–2006	59th Congress
2006	Eduardo Ortiz Hernández	National Action Party (Mexico)	2006–2009	60th Congress
2009	Aarón Irízar López	Institutional Revolutionary Party	2009–2012	61st Congress
2012	Jesús Antonio Valdés Palazuelos	Institutional Revolutionary Party	2012–2015	62nd Congress
2015	Manuel Jesús Clouthier Carrillo (Note: Clouthier Carrillo resigned his seat on 16 October 2017 and was replaced by his alternate, Zazueta Osuna, for the remainder of his term.); María del Rocío Zazueta Osuna	Independent politician	2015–2017; 2017–2018	63rd Congress
2018	Nancy Yadira Santiago Marcos	National Regeneration Movement	2018–2021	64th Congress
2021	Nancy Yadira Santiago Marcos	National Regeneration Movement	2021–2024	65th Congress
2024	Jesús Alfonso Ibarra Ramos	National Regeneration Movement	2024–2027	66th Congress

== Presidential elections ==
Sinaloa's 5th district
Election	District won by	Party or coalition	%
2018	Andrés Manuel López Obrador	Juntos Haremos Historia	69.8430
2024	Claudia Sheinbaum Pardo	Sigamos Haciendo Historia	59.8161
