= Armando Romero =

Armando Romero may refer to:

- Armando Romero (equestrian) (born 1949), Mexican equestrian
- Armando Romero (painter) (born 1964), Mexican painter
- Armando Romero (footballer) (1960–2020), Mexican footballer
- Armando Romero (soccer) (born 1983), professional soccer player
