= Bernardo Vega Carlos =

Mexican politician

- Born: 25 September 1957 (age 68); San Ignacio, Sinaloa, Mexico
- Occupations: Lawyer and politician
- Political party: PRI (1970s–2000s)

Bernardo Vega Carlos (born 25 September 1957) is a Mexican lawyer and politician formerly affiliated with the Institutional Revolutionary Party (PRI).

In 2003–2006, during the 59th session of Congress, Vega Carlos sat in the Chamber of Deputies to represent Sinaloa's 6th district as the alternate of Jorge Abel López Sánchez. On 16 March 2006, he broke with the PRI and subsequently sat as an independent.
