= Daniel Amador Gaxiola =

Mexican politician

- Born: 4 September 1956 (age 69); Elota, Sinaloa, Mexico
- Occupation: Politician
- Title: Senator (2012–2018)
- Political party: PRI
- Spouse: Estela Carrasco Rodriguez
- Children: 3

Daniel Amador Gaxiola (born 4 September 1956) is a Mexican politician affiliated with the Institutional Revolutionary Party (PRI).

Amador Gaxiola was municipal president of Elota, Sinaloa, from 1 January 2002 to 31 December 2004. In the 2006 general election he was elected to the Chamber of Deputies to represent Sinaloa's 6th district during the 60th session of Congress. In the 2012 general election he was elected to the Senate for Sinaloa, where he served during the 62nd and 63rd sessions of Congress.
