= Tropical Storm Norman (2012) =

Pacific tropical storm in 2012

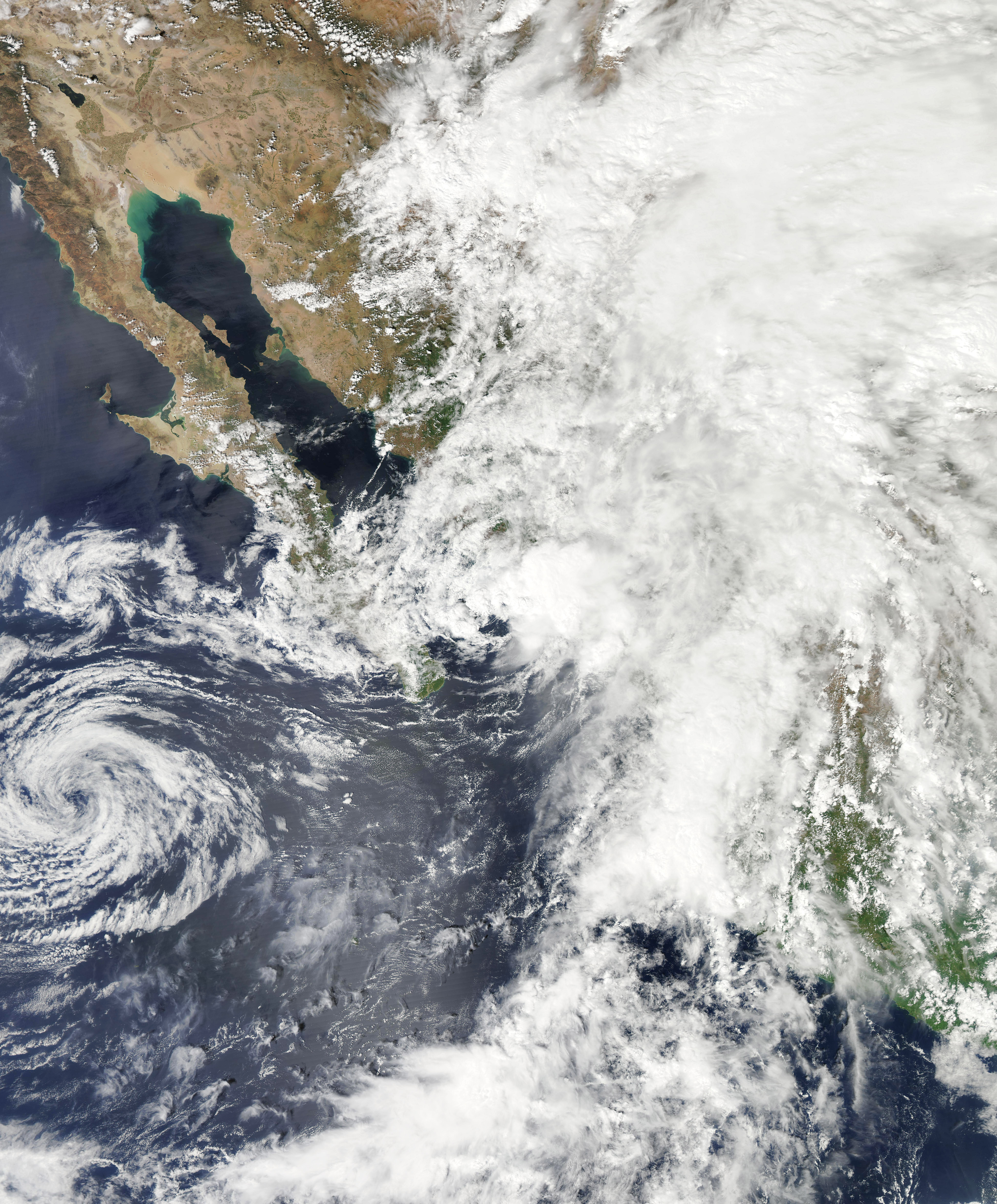
- Tropical Storm Norman approaching Sinaloa on September 28, with the remnant low of Hurricane Miriam to its west

Meteorological history
- Formed: September 28, 2012
- Remnant low: September 29, 2012
- Dissipated: September 30, 2012

Tropical storm
- 1-minute sustained (SSHWS/NWS)
- Highest winds: 50 mph (85 km/h)
- Lowest pressure: 997 mbar (hPa); 29.44 inHg

Overall effects
- Fatalities: 1 total
- Damage: Minimal
- Areas affected: Western Mexico, Baja California Peninsula, Northwestern Mexico, Texas
- IBTrACS
- Part of the 2012 Pacific hurricane season

Tropical Storm Norman was the fourteenth tropical cyclone of the 2012 Pacific hurricane season that brought minor flooding to western Mexico and record rainfall to areas of Texas in September 2012. Originating from a disturbance near the southern tip of Baja California, it soon moved north and developed into a tropical cyclone on September 28. Upon developing into one, Norman attained its peak intensity with maximum sustained winds of 50 mph (85 km/h). Heading northward into the Gulf of California, the storm began to weaken later that day due to southwesterly wind shear and land interaction. Norman curved northwestward and weakened to a tropical depression early on September 29. Around that time, it briefly moved inland near Topolobampo, Sinaloa, before re-emerging into the Gulf of California. Later on September 29, Norman degenerated into a remnant low pressure area.

In anticipation of the storm, a tropical storm warning was issued for a portion of the Pacific coast of Mexico. Additionally, orange, yellow, green, and blue alerts were posted for several states. About 553 shelters were opened, though only 65 people sought refuge in them. Heavy rainfall from Norman was reported in Colima, Jalisco, Nayarit, Sinaloa, Baja California Sur, Durango, and Zacatecas. In Baja California Sur, mudslides and flooding left roads impassable, mainly in the La Paz area. Flooding in Sinola left streets inundated and about 150 families fled their homes. About 24 cars in the area were swept away. The remnants of Norman brought record rainfall totals to some areas of Texas. Local flooding occurred, with a few roads inundated in Wimberley. A woman died after her vehicle was swept off the road.

== Meteorological history ==
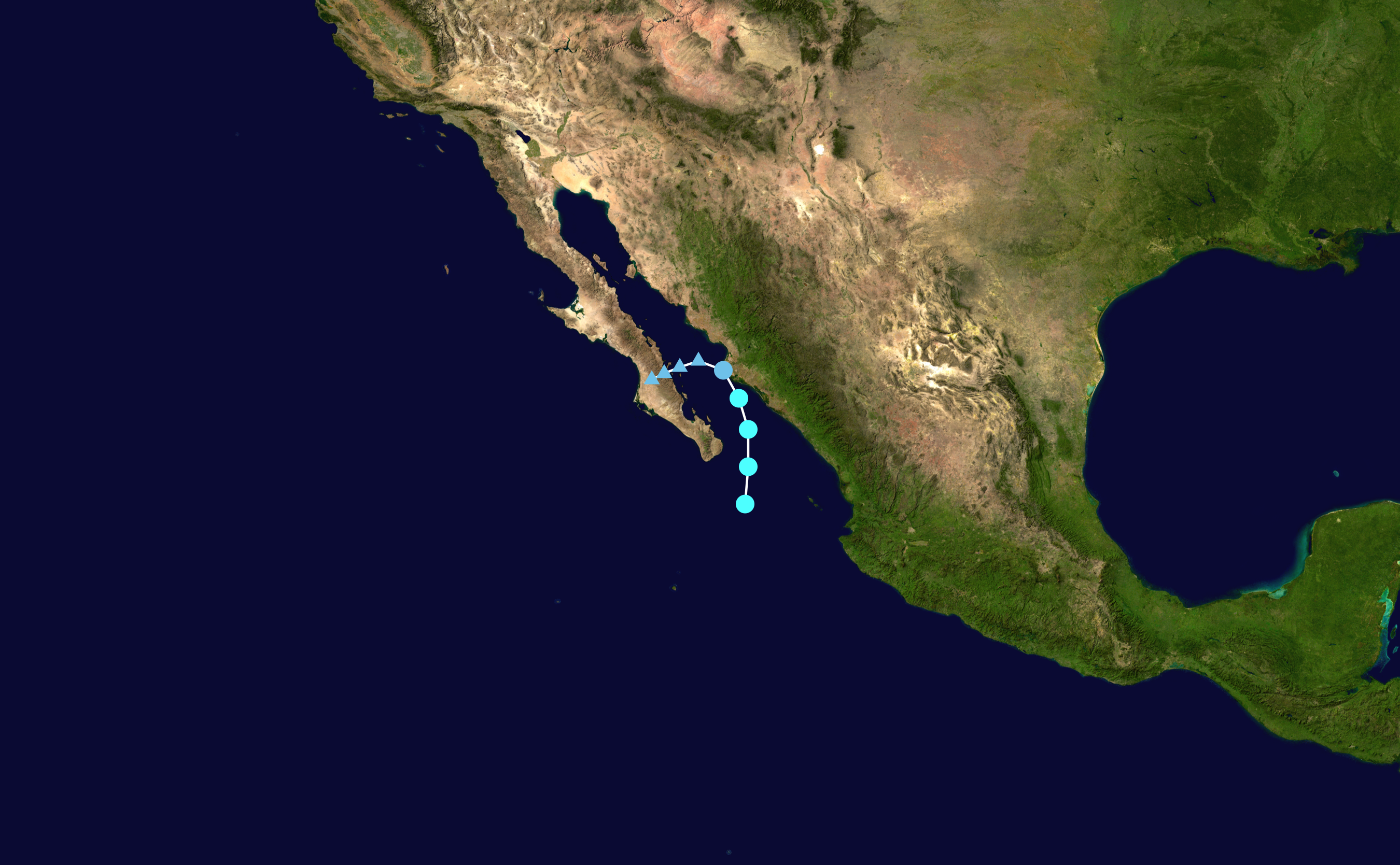
Map plotting the storm's track and intensity, according to the Saffir–Simpson scale Map key Saffir–Simpson scale Tropical depression (≤38 mph, ≤62 km/h) Tropical storm (39–73 mph, 63–118 km/h) Category 1 (74–95 mph, 119–153 km/h) Category 2 (96–110 mph, 154–177 km/h) Category 3 (111–129 mph, 178–208 km/h) Category 4 (130–156 mph, 209–251 km/h) Category 5 (≥157 mph, ≥252 km/h) Unknown Storm type Tropical cyclone Subtropical cyclone Extratropical cyclone, remnant low, tropical disturbance, or monsoon depression

A tropical wave emerged into the Atlantic Ocean from the west coast of Africa on September 12. The wave moved westward across the Atlantic basin with minimal deep convection. By September 23, it reached the eastern Pacific Ocean and began increasing in shower and thunderstorm activity over the next few days. While located near Acapulco another burst in convection occurred on September 25, likely due to interaction with the Intertropical Convergence Zone (ITCZ). Around that time, the National Hurricane Center began Tropical Weather Outlooks (TWOs) on the system, which is information issued every six hours on significant areas of disturbed weather and their potential for development out to 48 hours. The tropical wave split on September 26, with the northern portion moving northwestward near the southwestern coast of Mexico. By September 27, the system had organized deep convection and was producing tropical storm force winds, but data from scatterometers indicated that it lacked a closed circulation. Although TWOs issued on September 27 predicted a high probability for development, the chances for tropical cyclogenesis was decreased later that day, due to the system's close proximity to land.

On September 28, satellite data and ships' observations indicated a closed circulation. Thus, Tropical Storm Norman developed at 0600 UTC, while located about 115 mi (185 km) southeast of Cabo San Lucas. Initially, the storm was expected to intensify slightly before making landfall on September 29 and then dissipate on the following day. However, upon developing into a tropical cyclone at 1200 UTC on September 28, Norman attained its peak intensity with maximum sustained winds of 50 mph (85 km/h). Thereafter, Norman began heading northward between a mid-to upper-level low to its west and a mid-level ridge over the Gulf of Mexico. Later on September 28, the storm entered the Gulf of California and began weakening due to a significant increase in wind shear and interaction with land. Around that time, the cloud pattern became less organized and convection was being displaced from the circulation. Early on September 29, the storm curved northwestward and was downgraded to a tropical depression due to difficulty in locating the center of circulation and significant disorganization. Norman made landfall near Topolobampo with winds of 35 mph (55 km/h) at 0500 UTC on September 29. Shortly thereafter, the storm re-curved west-northwestward and re-emerged into the Gulf of California. Norman degenerated into a remnant low pressure area at 1200 UTC on September 29. The remnant low moved slowly west-southwestward, before dissipating over Baja California Sur near Loreto on September 30.

== Preparations and impact ==
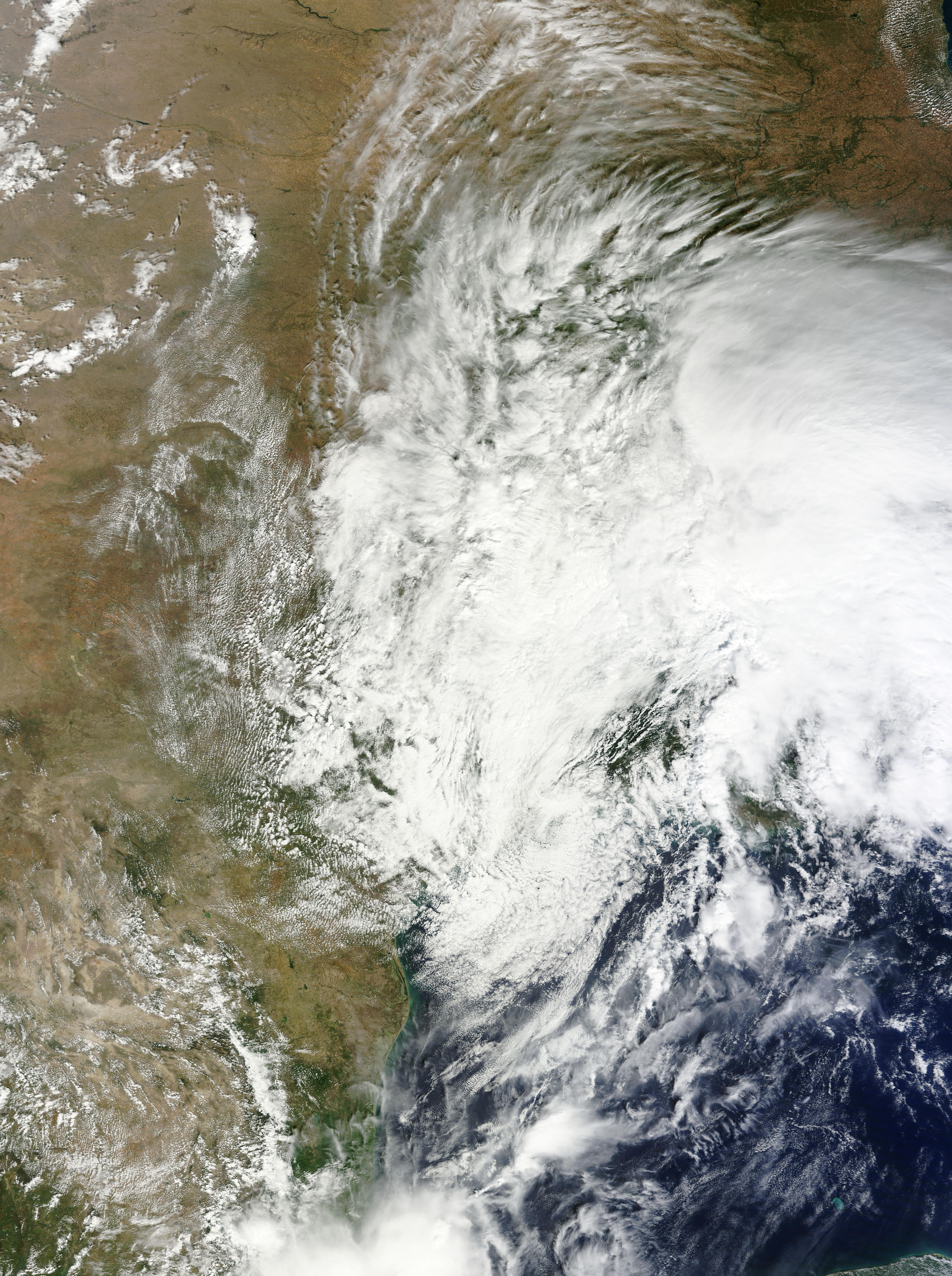
Remnant moisture associated with Norman over the United States on September 30

The Government of Mexico issued a tropical storm warning along the Pacific coast of Mexico from La Cruz, Sinaloa to Huatabampo at 1500 UTC on September 28. Early on the following day, the tropical storm warning was discontinued. An orange alert" (high risk) was issued for parts of the state of Sinaloa, and a yellow alert was in effect for Baja California Sur, and green alert was declared for southern Sonora. A "blue alert", minimum risk, was issued for north-central Sonora, Durango, Chihuahua and Zacatecas. Officials deployed 400 soldiers in the cities of La Paz and Los Cabos. According to the state director of Civil Protection, Carlos Enriquez Rincon, 500 schools were available to operate as temporary shelters. The shelters have a capacity of around 30,000 people, though only 65 people spent the first night of the storm in shelters. Furthermore, a total of 5,000 food packages were sent to residents. In the mainland, authorities in the municipality of Culiacán opened 53 shelters, with a total capacity of over 7,000. In addition, classes were suspended in 5 states.

Tropical Storm Norman brought extremely heavy rains to Colima, Jalisco, Nayarit, Sinaloa, Baja California Sur, Durango, and Zacatecas. The ports of Cabo San Lucas and San Jose del Cabo were closed for boats and water activities. In the former, 15–20 ft (4.6–6.1 m) waves were recorded. Due to mudslides and wash flooding over 24 cars were swept away in La Paz. In Sinaloa, the rains caused by Norman did not represent an important contribution to the 11 dams in the state, with mean water levels rising from 42.5% to 42.6%. Eight fisherman were rescued near the port of Mazatlan when their boat tipped over. Five fisherman were initially reported missing; however, following the passage of the storm, the missing people were later found alive. Street flooding was also reported. A total of 150 families were evacuated in two fishing villages along the mainland. Following the storm, a state of emergency was declared for the municipalities of Los Cabos, Angostura, and Navolato.

The remnants of Norman brought record rains to Texas. A peak rainfall total of 8.4 in (210 mm) fell on La Pryor. At Camp Mabry in Austin, 1.38 inches (35 mm) of rain fell in a 24‑hour period, breaking a daily precipitation record set in 1985. However, across the central portion of the state, rainfall from the system was less than expected. A few roads in Wimberley were temporarily closed due to flooding. One woman was killed in Nacogdoches County after her car was swept off a roadway. A tornado warning was also issued in the Corpus Christi area.

== See also ==
- Other storms of the same name
