= Irma Moreno Ovalles =

Mexican politician

- Born: Sinaloa, Mexico
- Occupation: Politician
- Political party: PRI

Irma Guadalupe Moreno Ovalles is a Mexican politician affiliated with the Institutional Revolutionary Party (PRI). In 2005–2006 she sat in the Chamber of Deputies representing Sinaloa's 5th district as the alternate of Jesús Vizcarra Calderón, who resigned his seat in December 2024.
