= 7th federal electoral district of Sinaloa =

Federal electoral district of Mexico

Sinaloa's 7th
- Electoral district of the Chamber of Deputies of Mexico

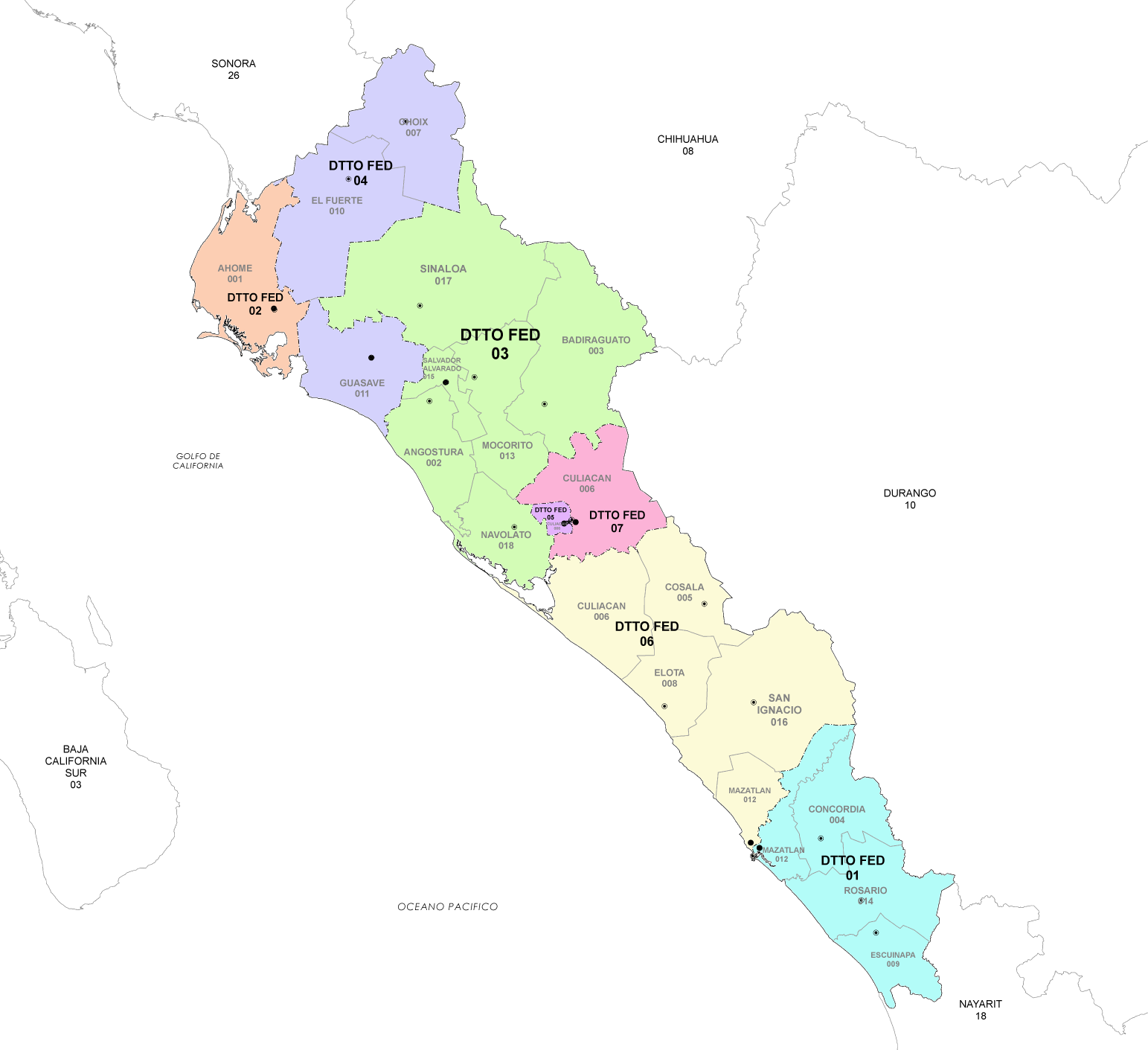
- 7th district since 2023

Incumbent
- Member: Merary Villegas Sánchez
- Party: ▌Morena
- Congress: 66th (2024–2027)

District
- State: Sinaloa
- Head town: Culiacán Rosales
- Coordinates: 24°48′N 107°23′W
- Covers: Municipality of Culiacán (part)
- PR region: First
- Precincts: 477
- Population: 430,512 (2020 census)

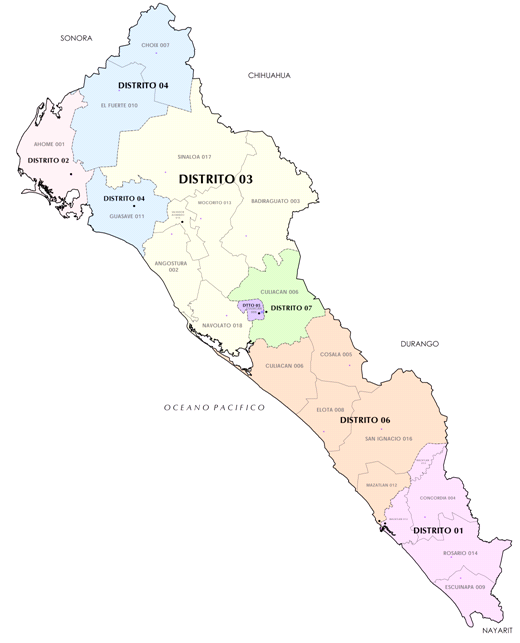
Sinaloa under the 2017–2022 districting scheme

The 7th federal electoral district of Sinaloa (Spanish: Distrito electoral federal 07 de Sinaloa) is one of the 300 electoral districts into which Mexico is divided for elections to the federal Chamber of Deputies and one of seven such districts in the state of Sinaloa.

It elects one deputy to the lower house of Congress for each three-year legislative session by means of the first-past-the-post system. Votes cast in the district also count towards the calculation of proportional representation ("plurinominal") deputies elected from the first region.

Suspended in 1930, (Note: An amendment to Article 52 of the Constitution in 1928 changed the original provision of "one deputy per 60,000 inhabitants" to "one deputy per 100,000"; as a result, the size of the Chamber of Deputies fell from 281 in the 1928 election to 171 in 1934.) the 7th district was re-established as part of the 1977 electoral reforms, which increased the number of single-member seats in the Chamber of Deputies from 196 to 300. Under that plan, Sinaloa's seat allocation rose from five to nine. The new districts were first contested in the 1979 legislative election.

The current member for the district, elected in the 2024 general election, is Merary Villegas Sánchez of the National Regeneration Movement (Morena).

== District territory ==
Under the 2023 districting plan adopted by the National Electoral Institute (INE), which is to be used for the 2024, 2027 and 2030 federal elections, the 7th district comprises 477 electoral precincts (secciones electorales) in the north of the municipality of Culiacán, excluding the urban core. (Note: Under the 2023 plan, the remainder of Culiacán is assigned to the 5th and 6th districts.)

The head town (cabecera distrital), where results from individual polling stations are gathered together and tallied, is the state capital, Culiacán Rosales. The district reported a population of 430,512 in the 2020 census.

== Previous districting schemes ==
Evolution of electoral district numbers
	1974	1978	1996	2005	2017	2023
Sinaloa	5	9	8	8	7	7
Chamber of Deputies	196	300				

2017–2022

As in the 2023 plan, the 7th district covered northern Culiacán, excluding the municipality's urban core. The city of Culiacán served as the head town.

1996–2017

Under both the 1996 and 2005 plans – albeit with slight adjustments to the dividing line with the 5th district – the 7th district comprised the southern part of the municipality of Culiacán. The state capital served as the head town.

1978–1996

From 1978 to 1996, the re-established 7th district was located in the north of the state, covering the municipalities of Angostura, Badiraguato, Mocorito and Salvador Alvarado. The head town was in Salvador Alvarado.

== Deputies returned to Congress ==
(Mexico) National parties
- Current
- PAN
- PRI
- PT
- PVEM
- MC
- Morena
- PAZ
- Somos
- Defunct or local only
- PLM
- PNR
- PRM
- PNM
- PP
- PPS
- PARM
- PFCRN
- CON
- PANAL
- PSD
- PES
- PES
- PRD

Sinaloa's 7th district
Election	Deputy	Party	Term	Legislature
1979	Baldomero López Arias	Institutional Revolutionary Party	1979–1982	51st Congress
1982	Maclovio Osuna Balderrama	Institutional Revolutionary Party	1982–1985	52nd Congress
1985	María Luisa Solís Payán	Institutional Revolutionary Party	1985–1988	53rd Congress
1988	David Miranda Valdez	Institutional Revolutionary Party	1988–1991	54th Congress
1991	Miguel Sotelo Burgos	Institutional Revolutionary Party	1991–1994	55th Congress
1994	Heriberto Galindo Quiñones	Institutional Revolutionary Party	1994–1997	56th Congress
1997	Ernesto Millán Escalante	Institutional Revolutionary Party	1997–2000	57th Congress
2000	Víctor Manuel Gandarilla Carrasco	Institutional Revolutionary Party	2000–2003	58th Congress
2003	Óscar Félix Ochoa	Institutional Revolutionary Party	2003–2006	59th Congress
2006	Jesús Manuel Patrón Montalvo	Institutional Revolutionary Party	2006–2009	60th Congress
2009	Óscar Javier Lara Aréchiga	Institutional Revolutionary Party	2009–2012	61st Congress
2012	Sergio Torres Félix (Note: Torres Félix resigned his seat to contend (successfully) for the municipal presidency of Culiacán.); Mirna Velázquez López	Institutional Revolutionary Party	2012–2012; 2013–2015	62nd Congress
2015	Rosa Elena Millán Bueno (Note: Millán Bueno resigned her seat on 1 January 2017; her alternate, Gárate Valenzuela, was sworn in on 2 February 2017.); Paola Iveth Gárate Valenzuela	Institutional Revolutionary Party	2015–2017; 2017–2018	63rd Congress
2018	Merary Villegas Sánchez	National Regeneration Movement	2018–2021	64th Congress
2021	Merary Villegas Sánchez	National Regeneration Movement	2021–2024	65th Congress
2024	Merary Villegas Sánchez (Note: Villegas Sánchez resigned her seat on 31 October 2024 and was replaced by her alternate, Flores Ojeda.); Danisa Magdalena Flores Ojeda	National Regeneration Movement	2024; 2024–2027	66th Congress

== Presidential elections ==
Sinaloa's 7th district
Election	District won by	Party or coalition	%
2018	Andrés Manuel López Obrador	Juntos Haremos Historia	66.6989
2024	Claudia Sheinbaum Pardo	Sigamos Haciendo Historia	62.1883
