= Acatitán =

Locality in the Mexican state of Sinaloa

- Town
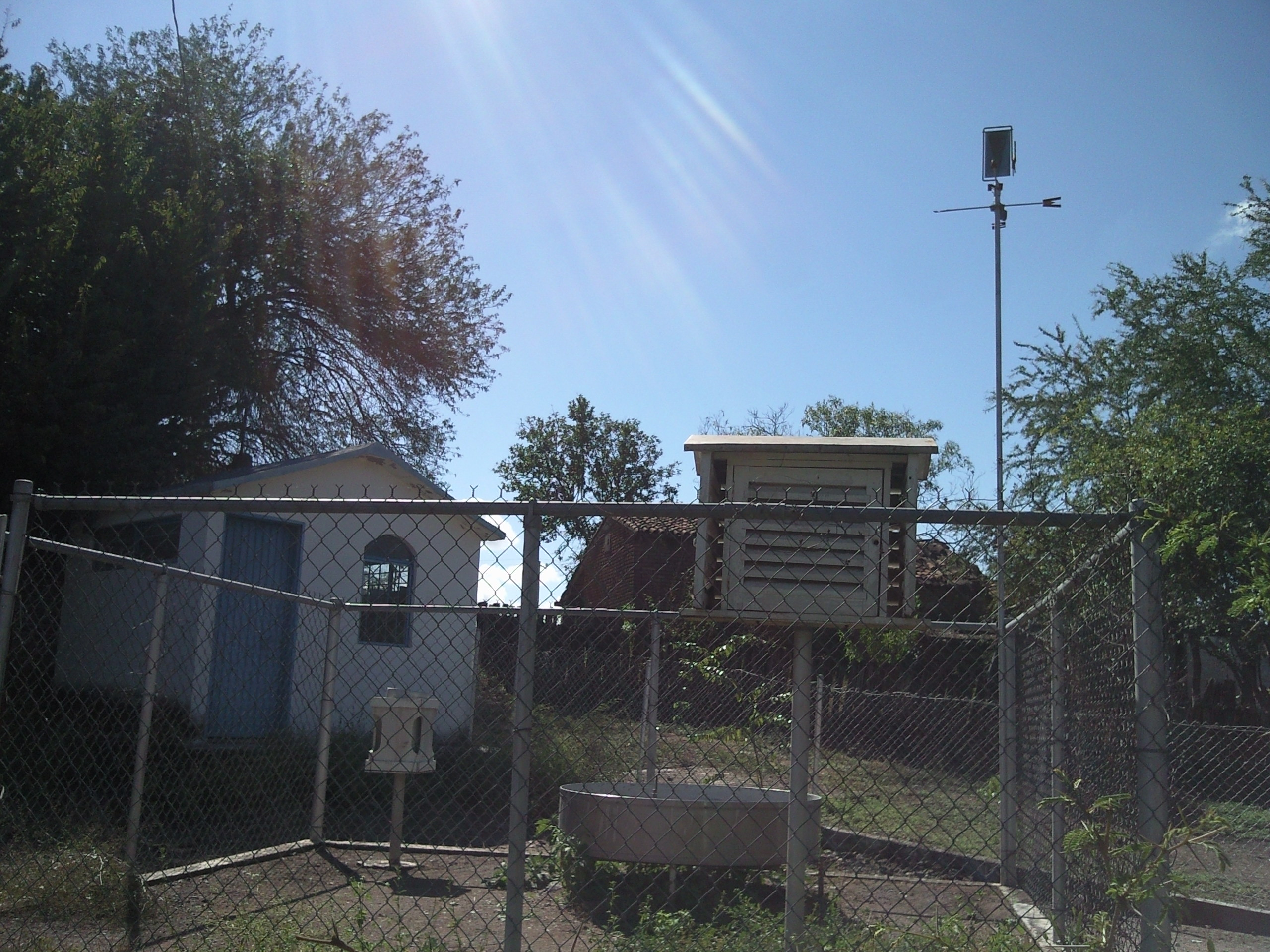
- Weather station in Acatitán
- Interactive map of Acatitán
- Country: Mexico
- State: Sinaloa
- Municipality: San Ignacio

Population
  - Total: 150
- Time zone: UTC-7 (Mountain Standard Time)
- Postal code: 82920
- Area code: 696

Acatitán is a mexican town located in San Ignacio Municipality, Sinaloa. It has just over 150 inhabitants. It is a place little frequented by tourists. The majority of its population is dedicated to agriculture and livestock. In the town there is the La Casa del Alto Museum dedicated to the jaguar and where archaeological pieces are exhibited.
