= Jaime Barrón Fonseca =

Mexican politician

- Born: 24 July 1954 (age 71); Escuinapa, Sinaloa, Mexico
- Occupation: Politician
- Political party: PRI

José Jaime Barrón Fonseca (born 24 July 1954) is a Mexican politician from the Institutional Revolutionary Party (PRI). In the 2000 general election he was elected to the Chamber of Deputies to represent Sinaloa's 6th district during the 58th session of Congress.
