= Francisca Elena Corrales =

Mexican politician

- Born: 19 May 1965 (age 61); Sinaloa, Mexico
- Occupation: Politician
- Political party: PRI

Francisca Elena Corrales Corrales (born 19 May 1965) is a Mexican politician affiliated with the Institutional Revolutionary Party (PRI). In the 2012 general election she was elected to the Chamber of Deputies to represent Sinaloa's 6th district during the 62nd session of Congress.
