= Sukarne =

Mexican meat company

- Industry: Food processing, Food distribution
- Founded: 1969; 57 years ago
- Headquarters: Culiacán, Mexico
- Key people: Jesus Vizcarra Calderon, Chairman
- Products: Meat
- Number of employees: 13,000
- Website: sukarne.com

SuKarne is a Mexican multinational corporation based in Culiacán, Mexico, that operates in the food protein industry. It is part of a family of companies under Grupo SuKarne.

The company annually exports the largest percentage of beef, pork, and chicken in Mexico, with at least 76% of the market. In 2010, the company had estimated world-wide beef sales of US$883 million, after an export growth of 60% in just one year.

The company makes a wide variety of animal-based and prepared products at its food processing plants. Currently, Grupo SuKarne generates more than 7,000 direct jobs, serves more than 40,000 customers, and maintains operations with companies in 18 countries. Its chain of production includes more than 80,000 agricultural and livestock providers.

SuKarne is also one of the largest North American marketers of value-added chicken, beef, and pork to retail grocers, broad-line food service distributors, and national fast-food and full-service restaurant chains, fresh beef and pork, frozen and fully cooked chicken, and case-ready beef and pork. It supplies many players in the food industry, including franchise restaurants, Walmart, HEB, and small restaurant businesses.

SuKarne's current chairman is Jesus Vizcarra Calderon.

== Jesus Vizcarra Calderon ==
As a young man, the current chairman of SuKarne, Jesus Vizcarra Calderon joined his family business, Corrales Vizcarra, an auxiliary cattle marketing and channel. In 1980, he was responsible for the general management. historia. Fundada en 1969, SuKarne comenzó como una pequeña empresa familiar dedicada a la engorda de ganado en la ciudad de Culiacán, Sinaloa por el matrimonio de Isabel Vizcarra y María Calderón.

In October 2011, the 'Latin Business Association' recognized Calderon for his career in SuKarne and his strong push to bring health services to the poor people through a large, successful program called "Salud Digna".

== Investments ==
In 2012, SuKarne announced it is investing $110 million to build the largest beef production and processing complex in Durango, Mexico. The complex is expected to create about 1,200 direct jobs and 6,000 indirect jobs, in addition to 680 jobs for initial construction.

== See also ==
- Food industry
