= Héctor Melesio Cuén =

Mexican politician (1955–2024)

Héctor Melesio Cuén Ojeda
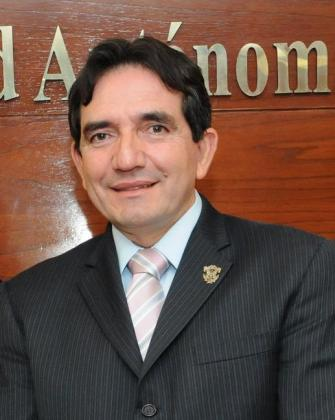
- Cuén c. 2009

Municipal president of Culiacán
- In office January 2011 – February 2012
- Preceded by: Carlos David Ibarra Félix
- Succeeded by: Aarón Rivas Loaiza

Rector of the Autonomous University of Sinaloa
- In office June 8, 2005 – June 8, 2009
- Preceded by: Gómer Monárrez González
- Succeeded by: Víctor Antonio Corrales Burgueño

Personal details
- Born: Héctor Melesio Cuén Ojeda; October 25, 1955 Badiraguato, Sinaloa, Mexico
- Died: July 25, 2024 (aged 68) Culiacán, Sinaloa, México
- Cause of death: Assassination (gunshot wounds)
- Education: Universidad Autonoma de Sinaloa

Héctor Melesio Cuén Ojeda (Note: In this Mexican name, the surname is Cuén and the second or maternal family name is Ojeda.) (October 25, 1955 – July 25, 2024) was a Mexican chemist, pharmacist, biologist, and politician. He was a rector of the Autonomous University of Sinaloa from 2005 to 2009 and municipal president of Culiacán, Sinaloa, between January 2011 and February 2012. In July 2024 he was shot dead in his vehicle in Culiacán.

== Life and career ==
Cuén Ojeda was born on October 25, 1955, in Badiraguato, Sinaloa, Mexico. He studied at the Autonomous University of Sinaloa, where he earned a PhD. After graduating from the university, he returned and was its rector from 2005 to 2009. From 2011 to 2012, he was the municipal president of Culiacán and, from 2013 to 2016, he sat in the Congress of Sinaloa.

He was elected to the Chamber of Deputies from the Institutional Revolutionary Party's proportional representation list for the first electoral region in the June 2024 general election.

== Assassination ==
Cuén Ojeda was killed on July 25, 2024. He was 68.

Initial reports of the crime published by the attorney-general of Sinaloa stated he had been shot in his vehicle at a filling station near Culiacán, but later claims maintained he was murdered at a ranch where he had been lured to attend a meeting with drug trafficker Ismael Zambada to settle his disputes with Governor Rubén Rocha Moya; blood samples located there by the federal attorney-general's office (FGR) appeared to confirm that version.

On 11 August 2024 the federal attorney-general's office announced it was investigating a possible connection between Cuén Ojeda's murder and the Sinaloa drug-traffickers Ismael Zambada and Joaquín Guzmán López, who were taken into custody in the United States later that day in circumstances that remain unclear.

Sinaloa Attorney-General Sara Bruna Quiñónez Estrada resigned on 16 August 2024.
