= Óscar Félix Ochoa =

Mexican politician

- Born: 19 May 1955 (age 71); Quila, Sinaloa, Mexico
- Occupation: Politician
- Political party: PRI

Óscar Félix Ochoa (born 19 May 1955) is a Mexican politician affiliated with the Institutional Revolutionary Party (PRI). In the 2003 mid-terms he was elected to the Chamber of Deputies to represent Sinaloa's 7th district during the 59th session of Congress.
