= Óscar Lara Aréchiga =

Mexican politician (born 1951 – 2017)

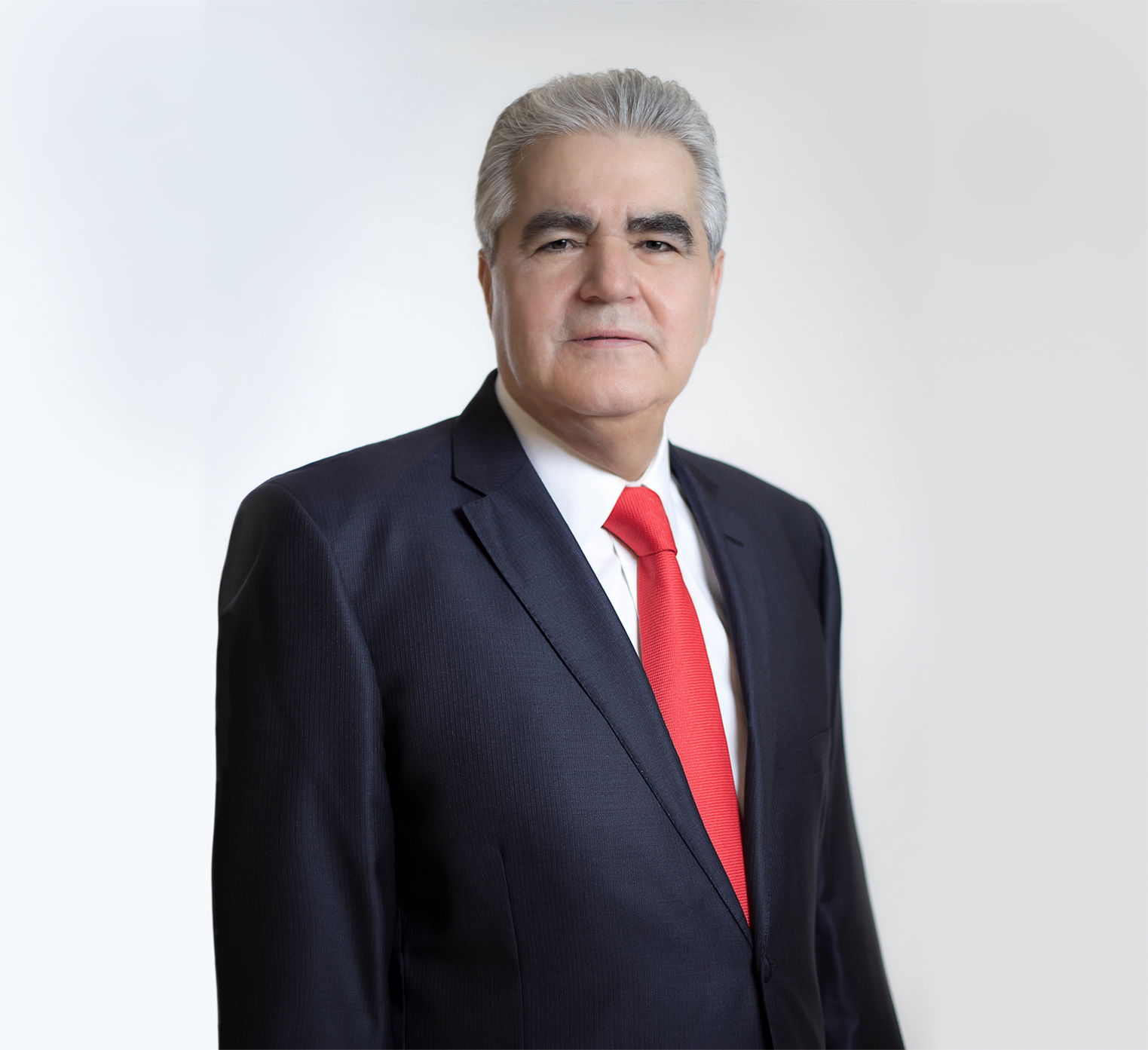
- Óscar Lara Aréchiga
- Born: Oscar Javier Lara Aréchiga; 26 November 1951; Culiacán, Sinaloa, Mexico
- Died: 7 October 2017 (aged 65); Culiacán, Sinaloa, Mexico
- Education: Universidad Autónoma de Sinaloa
- Occupations: Politician and businessman
- Political party: Institutional Revolutionary Party

Óscar Javier Lara Aréchiga (Note: In this Mexican name, the surname is Lara and the second or maternal family name is Aréchiga.) (26 November 1951 – 7 October 2017) was a Mexican politician, financial consultant and investor born in Culiacán, Sinaloa. From 1 June 2009 to 2 June 2012, he served in the Chamber of Deputies during the 61st Congress, representing Sinaloa's 7th district.

== Education ==
Aréchiga attended Eldorado Elementary School and Culiacán High School. He then attended the Autonomous University of Sinaloa, where he graduated with a BA in Economics. He then went on to the Institute of Technical Training Public Sector Economics, where he conducted studies on the formulation and evaluation of agro-industrial projects. After completing the IPADE, where he studied business management, he attended Harvard University and completed the business administration program.

== Career ==
For a period of 22 years (1974 to 1996), he participated in the Mexican financial sector. He began as a sub-branch manager in Banoro (Northwest Bank) and then served as manager of planning, deputy district director, deputy director general, and director general.

In 1992, while serving as Director of Planning Strategy Stock Exchange, Brokerage, he participated in the promotion to integrate the investor group that had acquired Northwest Banoro, with the Federal Government. From this acquisition, Banoro became the leading bank in northwestern Mexico. This was highlighted by credit volumes granted to the agro-food sectors — social and private as well as small and medium-sized processing industries — which succeeded in promoting and strengthening regional production chains.

In the public sector, Banoro was more active in financing productive infrastructure projects carried out by state and municipal governments in northwestern Mexico.

As a public servant, during the administrations led by Juan S. Millan Lizarraga (1999-2004) and Jesus Aguilar Padilla (2005-2010), Oscar had the honor of holding the position of Secretary of Administration and Finance.

During his tenure as Secretary, he undertook a number of projects focusing on the remodeling and modernisation of the state administration, whose main purpose was to improve the delivery of public services to citizens and strengthen the public finances of the state.

As a result of the social and productive investment Sinaloa had indicators of economic growth and the creation of jobs permanently, improving the levels of social welfare ,especially in the most vulnerable sectors. To get an increasing flow of federal funds to Sinaloa, they maintained a proactive and cooperative participation in the National System of Fiscal Coordination. This generated the support of the secretaries of finance of the country to chair for two consecutive years the Permanent Commission of Fiscal Officers and the six-year presidency of the Supervisory Committee of Federal Units.

In 2009, with the support of the Institutional Revolutionary Party (PRI), Oscar Javier participated as a candidate for Federal Deputy District VII, getting a great public support, which allowed him to be a member of the LXI Legislature Federal. As Federal Deputy, he had the honor of chairing the Water Resources Commission and ingbe a member of the committees on Budget and Public Accounts, Accounting and Harmonization.

In his tenure as Federal Deputy, he permanently participated in the analysis, discussion, adaptation, and adoption of appropriate initiatives; to modify, repeal, or create new laws, highlighting its importance in the creation of the General Laws of Climate Change and Competitiveness, as well as amendments to the Education Act, the taxation of Pemex and the Pensions Act for workers employed by the state, among others.

As Chairman of the Committee on Water Resources and a member of the Budget Committee, Oscar Javier also actively participated in the negotiations of revenue laws and decrees, budget of expenditures, which allowed to make the water sector national and specifically in Sinaloa there will be increasing budgets allocated to invest in strengthening and modernizing the productive infrastructure of Sinaloa, in regard to storage capacity as well as distribution of water.

In 2012, at the beginning of the administration of President Enrique Peña Nieto was appointed Deputy Director General of CONAGUA. In this position he was responsible for the Sub-Directorate General of Hydro-Agricultural Infrastructure, responsible for the planning, operation, modernization and construction of infrastructure that serves irrigation to more than one million farmers, irrigating an area of more than 10 million hectares surface in which 50% of national agricultural production and 70% of agricultural exports is harvested.

Similarly, the Sub-Directorate is responsible to plan and execute the construction of flood protection infrastructure in populated areas. In carrying out its responsibility as deputy director, and in order to boost productivity, profitability and competitiveness of the food sector in the country he prompted and the signing of a coordination agreement CONAGUA-SAGARPA took shape, so considering water availability, sustainable use thereof and the agricultural market conditions, planting surfaces were planned in each district of irrigation and productive region of the country. In January 2013 he returned to the private sector currently serving as adviser and consultant to national and international companies in the agribusiness, financial, commercial and engineering infrastructure sectors. It also continues as an investor in various companies like Agrofinanciera del Noroeste, Grupo Viz and Promocion y Gestion Consultoria de Negocios.
