= Germán Contreras García =

Mexican politician

- Born: 4 April 1962 (age 64); Misantla, Veracruz, Mexico
- Occupation: Politician
- Political party: PRI

Germán Contreras García (born 4 April 1962) is a Mexican politician from the Institutional Revolutionary Party (PRI). In the 2009 mid-terms he was elected to the Chamber of Deputies to represent Sinaloa's 6th district during the 61st session of Congress.
