= Heriberto Galindo Quiñones =

Mexican politician and diplomat

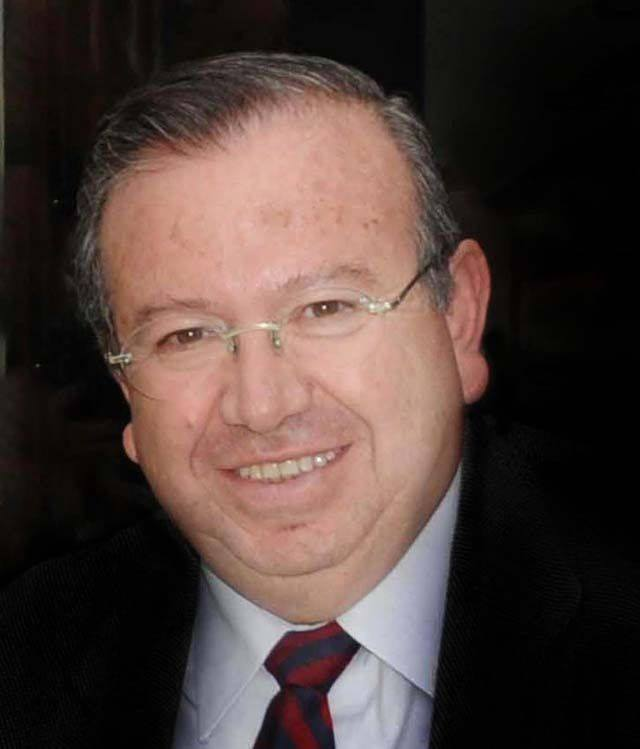
- Born: 20 March 1951 (age 75); Guamúchil, Sinaloa, Mexico
- Education: UNAM
- Occupations: Deputy and diplomat
- Political party: PRI

Heriberto Manuel Galindo Quiñones (born 20 March 1951) is a Mexican politician and diplomat affiliated with the Institutional Revolutionary Party (PRI).

Galindo Quiñones has been elected to the Chamber of Deputies on two occasions: in the 1994 general election, for Sinaloa's 7th district (57th Congress), and in the 2012 general election, as a plurinominal deputy for the first region (62nd Congress).

Between 2000 and 2001 he served as Ambassador of Mexico to Cuba.
