= List of storms named Norman =

The name Norman has been used for nine tropical cyclones worldwide: seven in the East Pacific Ocean, one in the South Pacific Ocean, and one in the Australian region.

In the East Pacific:

- Hurricane Norman (1978) – Category 4 hurricane whose remnants brought locally heavy rains to California
- Hurricane Norman (1982) – Category 2 hurricane that turned toward Baja California
- Tropical Storm Norman (1994) – weak, short-lived tropical storm
- Tropical Storm Norman (2000) – struck Mexico
- Tropical Storm Norman (2006) – near southwestern Mexico
- Tropical Storm Norman (2012) – weak and short lived, struck Mexico
- Hurricane Norman (2018) – Category 4 hurricane that moved into the Central Pacific

In the South Pacific:

- Cyclone Norman (1977) – tracked near Vanuatu and New Caledonia

In the Australian region:

- Cyclone Norman (2000) – paralleled the Kimberley and Pilbara regions of Western Australia with no direct impact
