= Sergio Torres Félix =

Mexican politician

- Born: 5 June 1966 (age 60); Culiacán, Sinaloa, Mexico
- Education: Autonomous University of Sinaloa
- Occupation: Politician
- Political party: MC (since 2020)
- Other political affiliations: PRI

Sergio Torres Félix (Note: In this Mexican name, the surname is Torres and the second or maternal family name is Félix.) (born 5 June 1966) is a Mexican politician. He has been affiliated with both the Institutional Revolutionary Party (PRI) and the Citizens' Movement (MC).

Sergio Torres Félix was born in Culiacán, Sinaloa, in 1966. He holds degrees in law and in accountancy and management from the Autonomous University of Sinaloa (UAS).

From 2007 to 2010 he was a local deputy in the Congress of Sinaloa and, in the 2012 general election, he was elected to the Chamber of Deputies for the PRI to represent Sinaloa's 7th district during the 62nd Congress. However, on 9 April 2013, he resigned his seat to contend for the municipal presidency of Culiacán, a position in which he served from 2013 to 2015. (Note: His alternate, Mirna Velázquez López, served out the remainder of his congressional term.)

During Quirino Ordaz Coppel's term as governor of Sinaloa (2017–2021), Sergio Torres served in his cabinet as secretary of fisheries. He resigned that position and his membership in the PRI in 2020 to contend for the governorship in the 2021 state election on the Citizens' Movement (MC) ticket but placed third with around 3% of the vote.

== Attack ==
As a member of the Congress of Sinaloa for the Citizens' Movement, he was seriously injured in an armed attack in Culiacán on 28 January 2026.
