= Manuel Patrón Montalvo =

Mexican politician

- Born: 20 June 1957 (age 68); Culiacán, Sinaloa, Mexico
- Occupation: Politician
- Political party: PRI

Jesús Manuel Patrón Montalvo (born 20 June 1957) is a Mexican politician from the Institutional Revolutionary Party (PRI). From 2006 to 2009 he served in the Chamber of Deputies during the 60th Congress representing Sinaloa's 7th district.
