= Mirna Velázquez López =

Mexican politician

- Born: 6 December 1957 (age 68); Guasave, Sinaloa, Mexico
- Occupation: Politician
- Political party: PRI

Mirna Velázquez López (born 6 December 1957) is a Mexican politician affiliated with the Institutional Revolutionary Party (PRI). In 2013–2015 she served as a federal deputy during the 62nd Congress, representing Sinaloa's 7th district as the alternate of Sergio Torres Félix.
