= Eduardo Ortiz Hernández =

Mexican lawyer and politician

- Born: 26 November 1963 (age 62); Culiacán, Sinaloa, Mexico
- Occupations: Lawyer and politician
- Political party: PAN

Eduardo Ortiz Hernández (born 26 November 1963) is a Mexican lawyer and politician from the National Action Party (PAN).

From 2006 to 2009 Ortiz Hernández served as in the Chamber of Deputies during the 60th session of Congress representing Sinaloa's fifth district.

He sought election as one of Sinaloa's senators in the 2024 Senate election, occupying the second place on the Fuerza y Corazón por México coalition's two-name formula. The coalition placed second in the election and, consequently, Ortiz Hernández was not elected.
