= Tatiana Clouthier =

Mexican educator, politician and writer

- Clouthier in 2025
- Born: Tatiana Clouthier Carrillo; August 12, 1964 (age 62); Culiacán, Sinaloa, Mexico
- Education: Monterrey Institute of Technology and Higher Education (B.A.)
- Occupations: Educator, politician and writer
- Spouse: José Martínez
- Children: 2
- Relatives: Manuel Clouthier (father); Manuel Clouthier Carrillo (brother); Irene Clouthier (sister)
- Writing career
- Notable work: Crónica de un fraude anunciado

Tatiana Clouthier Carillo (born August 12, 1964) is a Mexican educator, politician and writer. From December 8, 2020 to October 6, 2022, she served as the head of the Secretariat of Economy of Mexico appointed by President Andrés Manuel López Obrador. Clouthier came to national attention in Mexico as the 2018 presidential campaign manager for President Andrés Manuel López Obrador. She was particularly prominent on social media during the campaign.

== Life and education ==
Clouthier is one of eleven children born to Leticia Carrillo and politician Manuel Clouthier, the 1988 National Action Party presidential candidate who died in an automobile crash in 1989, when she was in her mid-20s. She is one of three children to go into politics. She stated that while she does not deny her roots, she is more than just the daughter of Manuel Clouthier, “I am not just a last name… I make my own way.”

Although she comes from a well-to-do agricultural family, she went to public schools, such as the General Ángel Flores public school in Culiacán. She studied a Bachelors degree in English Language at the Monterrey Institute of Technology and Higher Education as well as her masters in public administration at the Universidad Autónoma de Nuevo León. She has also taken various extracurricular courses in education, teaching, human right and civics, at schools such as the Graduate School of Political Management at George Washington University. She believes her experiences in public education allows her to build bridges among the social classes.

Although Clouthier grew up in Sinaloa, she has spent most of her life in Nuevo León, currently a resident of San Pedro Garza García. She is married to José Martínez and the couple have two children.

== Political career ==
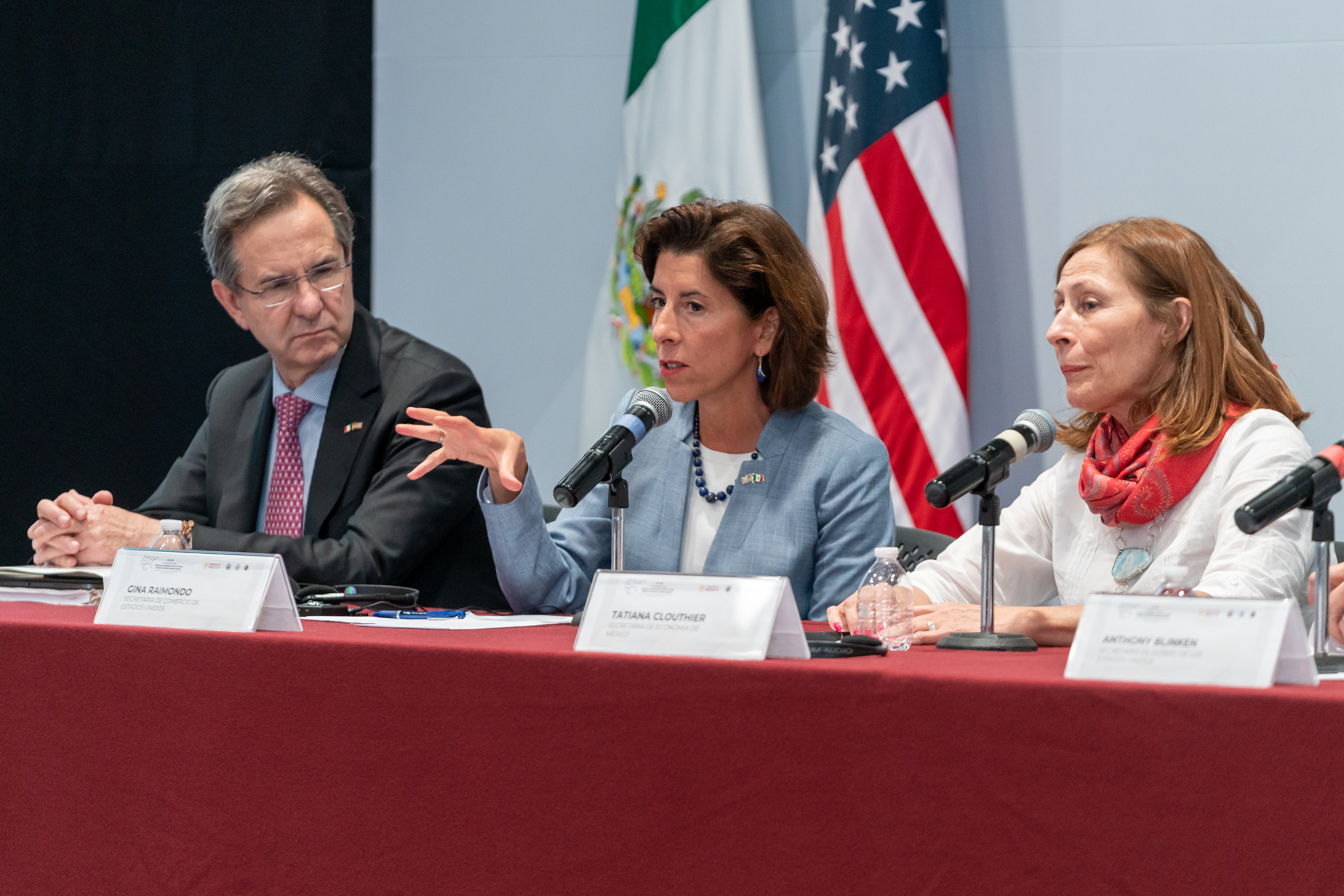
Clouthier (right) with US Secretary of Commerce Gina Raimondo (center) in 2022

Clouthier began her career as a teacher and translator. She cofounded and ran a translation business from 1986 to 1990. From 1982 to 1994 she taught English, Mexican history and socioeconomics in schools such as Monterrey Tech and the Centro Universitario México. She was principal at the preparatory school of the Universidad Metropolitana de Monterrey, a school for economically-disadvantaged children.

Clouthier founded and held positions in several social service organizations. From 2000 to 2003, she was an advisor to the Instituto Nacional de las Mujeres. In 2009, she was one of the founders of Evolución Mexicana A.C., which promotes civic responsibility and democracy.

Between 1989 and 1997 she held various administrative positions with the San Pedro Garza García municipality such as direction of human affairs, assistant to the secretary of primary services and the director of tourism, education and sports. From 1997 to 2001, she was the coordinator of junior high education and social services with the Secretariat of Education of the state of Nuevo León.

Initially, Clouthier followed her father into the National Action Party (PAN) and was a member from 1991 to 2005. With this party, she served as a federal deputy from 1991 to 1994, then again from 2003 to 2005. However, she became disillusioned with this party, and left even though she was criticized for betraying her father. Today, she says that it is a "bad copy of the Institutional Revolutionary Party," the party that her father was so against. In 2009, she was a candidate for municipal president for San Pedro with Nueva Alianza.

=== Manager of the campaign of Andrés Manuel López Obrador ===
Clouthier has come to national attention as the campaign manager for the 2018 presidential campaign of Andrés Manuel López Obrador. She articulated and promoted the potential benefits of electing Andrés Manuel López Obrador to the Presidency of Mexico.

Despite her history, her choice to support López Obrador came as a surprise to her family. However, she states that many of the candidate's political positions are similar to those of her father, who was also called a populist. Despite her close association with López Obrador, she is not a member of his party. She states she has disagreements with López Obrador but will not say what they are publicly.

Clouthier's main success has been managing the candidate's and campaign's online presence, especially in social media and particularly in a Twitter account called Abre Más Los Ojos (Open Your Eyes Wider). One of her sisters once told her that if Twitter did not exist, Clouthier would have invented it. She discovered Twitter during her work with various civic organizations, as a way to reach the public quickly. Then she began using it for lower-level political campaigns, especially for recruiting. She likes the platform because it is immediate, short and direct, considering it a natural ally for the campaign. She directs a team responsible for social media messaging, focused on pushing the campaign's narrative and defending against attacks by other candidates. In particular, she has been successful in communicating political ideas through videos, images, GIFs and memes. Her social media work riffs off of popular culture and statements by the other campaigns. For example, she had an image of López Obrador photoshopped with the gauntlet from Infinity War with the five gems of power. Underneath the image appear the words "corruption disintegrating".

Her success in this area has moved her into the spotlight, now appearing more traditional media, and other more traditional publicity moves. She boarded the Metro in Mexico City to pass out flyers among riders along with the Regeneración newspaper.

However, not all of her work with the campaign has been successful. Media and opposing candidates challenged tweets made asserting that between 2001 and 2004, when López Obrador headed the Mexico City government, that Mexico City had attracted 57.8% of the country's foreign investment, stating that "…the numbers do not lie." However, according to the Secretariat of the Economy, the city attracted only 26.36%. Other numbers off too. The scandals was dubbed in the press "Pejenomics" after the candidate's nickname Another problem on Twitter occurred when she appeared in a photo with a Rolex watch. The image contrasted with the austere image of the campaign, forcing her to state that it had been a gift from her husband on the birth of their second son. In Buzzfeed News, she stated that she should not be called a feminist because the term "is out of fashion as such" (está pasado de moda como tal) and for her, it is not about creating spaces for women in the workplace but rather that women have access to services they need for their families, such as childcare. The statement caused some controversy. There was a false report that she suspended activities due to death threats, but she says she was never threatened.

She was relatively unknown at the start of López Obrador's campaign, but became one of its main protagonists, becoming an icon. Clouthier's work succeeded in bringing many young people to the campaign, and her popularity is such that other candidates have reminded voters that López Obrador is running for president and not her. From her connection with Mexican youth, she was nicknamed on Twitter as "Tía Tatis" ("Aunt Tatis").

=== After campaign of Andrés Manuel López Obrador ===
After receiving offers to be part of the Andrés Manuel López Obrador's cabinet, Tatiana Clouthier chose to be a Proportional Representation Deputy for the Chamber of Deputies, a position she held from December 1, 2018 to December 7, 2020. On that date she was appointed by López Obrador as Secretary of Economy. In 2021, Clouthier commissioned Rodney Frelinghuysen, a former member of the United States House of Representatives, to lobby on behalf of the Secretary of Economy's interests in Washington.

== Publications ==
Clouthier has written for various publications. She coedited the Cuaderno de Trabajo de Cultura de la Legalidad, had a column with the El Financiero, Reporte Indigo and Periódico Noroeste newspapers and wrote for the Players of Life magazine from 2010 to 2014.

Clouthier has published five books:

- Crónica de un fraude anunciado with Jesús Cantú and Cuahutémoc Rivera (1992)
- Maquío Mi Padre (2006)
- Una visión del Congreso (2006)
- Parejas Parejas with Valeria Guerra (2017)
- Juntos hicimos historia (2018)
