= Armando Romero (soccer) =

American soccer player

Personal information
- Full name: Jose Armando Romero
- Date of birth: February 10, 1983 (age 43)
- Place of birth: Arlington County, Virginia, United States
- Height: 5 ft 8 in (1.73 m)
- Position: Midfielder

College career
Years	Team	Apps	(Gls)
2002–2003	Louisburg Hurricanes		
2004–2005	Radford Highlanders		

Senior career*
Years	Team	Apps	(Gls)
2006–2007	Charleston Battery	37	(11)
- * Club domestic league appearances and goals

Armando Romero (born February 10, 1983) is a retired professional soccer player. He played for the Charleston Battery in the First Division in 2006 and 2007.

Armando attended public schools in Arlington County, Virginia, and played for the Arlington Fireballs and Arlington Mustangs club teams in the National Capital Soccer League (NCSL). He attended Yorktown High School where he was a soccer standout. Armando was named National District Player of the Year as a junior in 2001 (Virginia public schools play soccer in the spring.) He was All-District as a sophomore, junior, and senior and All-Region and All-Met as a junior and senior.

Armando attended Louisburg (junior) College in Louisburg, North Carolina, where during his freshman and sophomore years he starred for the Hurricanes, a NJCAA Top Ten team. He transferred to Radford University in his junior year and quickly established himself as an offensive leader. Following his senior season in 2005, he was named to the Big South Conference First Team.
