= Irene Clouthier =

Mexican artist (born 1974)

Irene Clouthier Carrillo (born 1974) is a multi-disciplinary artist born in Culiacán, Sinaloa, Mexico, who has lived and worked in the Washington DC metro area since 2000. Her artistic practice centers on themes of childhood nostalgia and the idealization of early memories, incorporating imagery, objects, and materials drawn from childhood games and toys. Some of her early works in the U.S. addressed the visual disparity of the landscapes in the U.S. versus her native country. Several of her recent works have also explored social and humanitarian concerns.

Though primarily an independent artist, Clouthier has also contributed to various art collectives. She is currently collaborating with the Icebox Collective on the Nomadic House Project and previously participated with Exotico Noreste Collective and the Floating Art Collective.

Irene is both a visual artist and a curator. She has curated shows at museums, art centers, art fairs, non-profit spaces, and commercial galleries in the US and in Mexico.

== Education and career ==
Raised in Culiacán, Sinaloa, Mexico, Irene left home in her teens to study at the Monterrey Institute of Technology and Higher Education. She grew up in a city with no museums therefore when the Sinaloa Museum of Art (MASIN)opened in 1995, she volunteered over the summer very exited to be part of that big change in Culiacán at the newly opened Sinaloa Museum of Art. Later during her college years she got a position at Drexel Galería in Monterrey where she began meeting established Mexican artists like Perla Krauze, Gerardo Azcúnaga and Armando Romero while learning more about the business side of art, and was allowed to begin curating, coordinating exhibitions and do exhibition design.

Following her time in Monterrey, when she finished high school, Clouthier completed preparatory classes in France and her undergraduate work in Mexico at the University of Monterrey where she studied under artists Jorge Elizondo and Aldo Chaparro. When she graduated she was hired by her alma mater Universidad de Monterrey to teach, at the same time her colleague and co-worker Aldo Chaparro allowed her to used and worked in his studio in Monterrey. Three and a half years after completing her undergraduate degree and working in the art field, she moved to the U.S. where she pursued graduate studies and began showing with the Marina Kessler Gallery and later with Lowenstein Gallery.

Clouthier's first solo show was at the Antonio Lopez Saenz Gallery (now GAALS), Culiacan (1998) in Mexico followed by her first U.S. solo show at the Apama Strickland Gallery (Formerly 527) in Houston, Texas (2000). She has since had several solo shows internationally, including in Spain, Cuba, U.S. and Mexico, as well as over 200 group shows across the globe in 15 countries. Clouthier's work was chosen for 15 international biennials including the Valencia Biennial Ciutat Vella 2021 where she received an honorary mention.

== Personal life ==
Irene Clouthier was born in Culiacán, Sinaloa, Mexico to Manuel J. Clouthier del Rincón and Leticia Carrillo Cásarez. She was the youngest of eleven children (six girls and five boys). She and her twin brother, Ricardo, were the second set of fraternal twins born to her large family.

In 1987, Clouthier's father, Manuel (often referred to as Maquio), ran for the presidency of Mexico. This experience put Clouthier into the public eye since she and her siblings periodically toured Mexico with Maquio during his campaign. In the year following the election, Clouthier suffered the loss of her father in a tragic car accident. This loss was rumored to be a purposeful act in response to his political activism and movement towards electoral reform.

By the time Clouthier was fourteen, she publicly experienced the death of her young brother, Cid Estaban, and her father, Maquío. These experiences informed Clouthier's work where she explores ideas of nostalgia, memory and play. Her work often incorporates the colors, materials, and aesthetic of her early 80s experiences and Mexican heritage. When asked about her art, Clouthier frequently mentions the cultural importance of kitsch in the Mexican aesthetic folk art and indigenous traditions.

== Political activism ==
Clouthier was brought up in a family which regularly participated in acts of political demonstrations. Clouthier continued her political activism with her performance work as part of the Floating Lab Collective with Chilean artist Edgar Endress in 2007 for the Transitio MX festival at Laboratorio de Arte Alameda Museum in Mexico City. The work, Protesting on Demand, was originally produced in DC and then was tailored for the Transitio MX International Electronic and Video Arts Festival 2: Nomadic Borders under Grace Quintanilla. The art piece shown in Transitio MX as a simultaneous performance at the White House in the US and the Zocalo Plaza in Mexico City ran over a live feed at Laboratorio de Arte Alameda Museum. The show incorporated three-minute protests with participants from the street and tackled the many issues facing the U.S. and Mexican governments at the time.

Clouthier created an immersive Day of the Dead installation in 2018 at the Mexican Cultural Institute in Washington DC. The piece, They Silenced Us, was dedicated to the femicide victims in Mexico using elements found in traditional Day of the Dead altars (ofrenda).

As a contributor to the Icebox Collective, Clouthier has been instrumental in the three iterations of the Nomadic House Project which addresses issues of home, shelter, and displacement.

Clouthier has a long running pursuit of social injustices personally as well as professionally. Though she achieved artistic success, she also experienced some of the challenges facing immigrants in the U.S. Some of these experiences are explored in work like the piece shown in The Looking Glass: Artist Immigrants of Washington. On a personal level, these experiences led her to volunteer work supporting the Latino community in the Washington DC metro area. She continued the non-violent protests she observed as a child and supported non-profit initiatives. She was one of the founding members of Latinas 4 Latinas and currently serves as the Vice Chair for non-profit Nueva Vida.
