= Aarón Irízar López =

Mexican politician

- Born: 28 February 1950 (age 76); Guamúchil, Sinaloa, Mexico
- Occupation: Politician
- Political party: PRI

Aarón Irízar López (born 28 February 1950) is a Mexican politician affiliated with the Institutional Revolutionary Party (PRI).

Irízar López has served terms in both chambers of Congress. In the 2000 general election he was elected to the Chamber of Deputies for Sinaloa's 5th district and, in the 2009 mid-terms, he was re-elected to the same seat. Following the end of his second term in the lower house, he successfully contended for one of Sinaloa's Senate seats in the 2012 general election.
