= San Ignacio, Sinaloa =

City in the Mexican state of Sinaloa

San Ignacio San Ignacio de Piaxtla
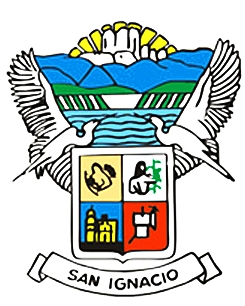
- Seal

- Location in Mexico San Ignacio; San Ignacio de Piaxtla (Mexico)
- Coordinates: 23°56′12″N 106°25′39″W
- Country: Mexico
- State: Sinaloa
- Municipality: San Ignacio
- Founded in: 1633

Government
  - Municipal president: Dr. Jesús Alfonso Lafarga Zazueta

Population (2010)
  - Total: 4,543
- Time zone: UTC-7 (Mountain Standard Time)

San Ignacio or San Ignacio de Piaxtla is a city and seat of the surrounding San Ignacio Municipality in the Mexican state of Sinaloa.

It stands at 23°56′12″N 106°25′39″W. The municipality reported 4,543 inhabitants in the 2010 census.

In 2023, San Ignacio was designated a Pueblo Mágico by the Mexican government, recognizing its cultural and historical importance.

== Notable people ==
In this town actress Ofelia Cano was born.
