= Jesus Vizcarra Calderón =

Mexican businessman and politician

Jesus Vizcarra Calderon
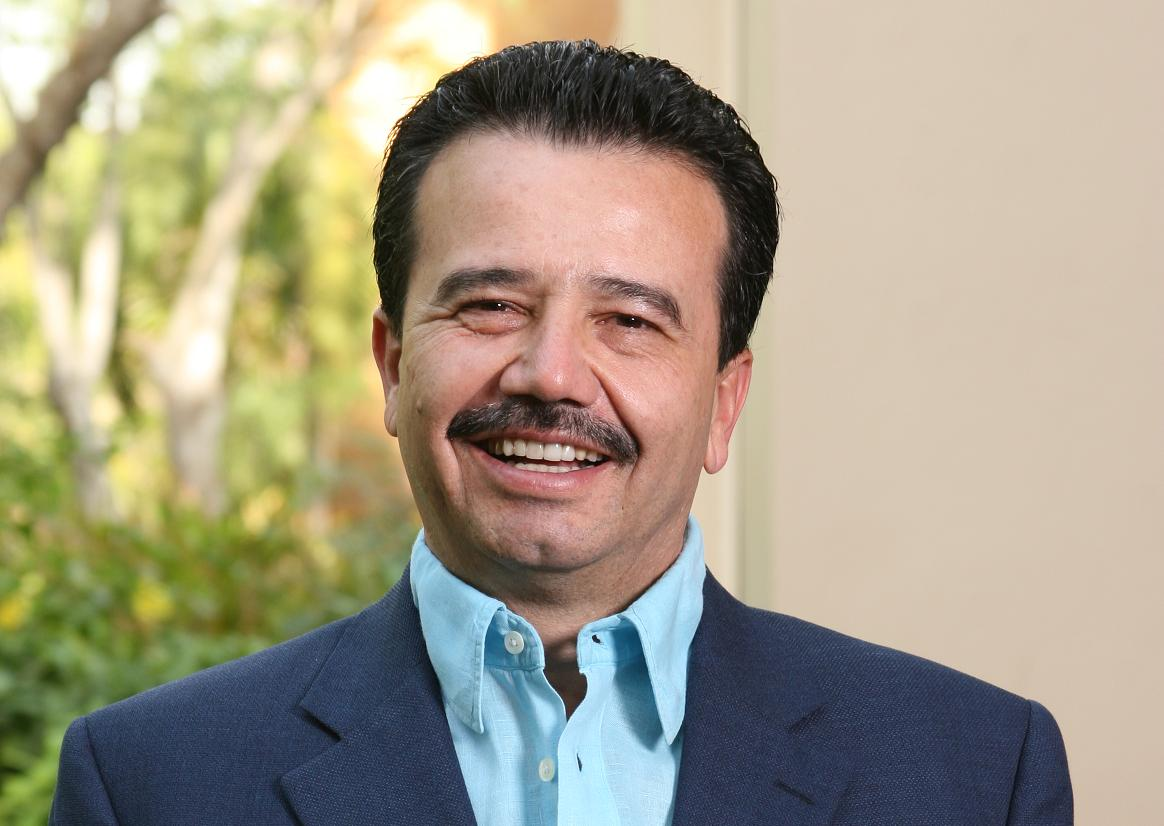

Municipal president of Culiacán

Personal details
- Born: 17 March 1960 (age 66) Culiacán, Sinaloa, Mexico
- Profession: Businessman and politician
- Website: Official Site of Jesus Vizcarra

Jesus Vizcarra Calderon (born 17 March 1960) is a Mexican businessman and politician.

== Biography ==
Born in Culiacán, Sinaloa. Vizcarra graduated from the Autonomous University of Sinaloa. Between 20 and 42 years old, he led various business organizations, getting to chair the National Agricultural Council and served on the Executive Committee of the Business Council for 4 years. Between 1998 and 2002 he chaired the Mexican Association of Feedlot Cattle. In 1971, he began working with Sukarne, Formerly known as Viz Group, a company founded by his parents in 1969.

In 2003, his family established Salud Digna, a nonprofit institution that has installed 33 centers for prevention and early diagnosis in Querétaro, Durango, Sinaloa, Nayarit, Coahuila, Jalisco, Sonora, Baja California, Guanajuato, Puebla, Aguascalientes, Mexico City and Los Angeles, California, the latter being the first Mexican clinic to provide these services to the Latino community. Today it is the most important institution of social health in Mexico, and in 2014 it will serve more than 3 million people.

== Business Biography ==
Very young, Jesus joined the family business, Corrales Vizcarra, as auxiliary cattle marketing and channel. In 1980 he was responsible for the general management and, from 1985 took the Chair and Department of the company, under his command that has evolved into Sukarne. In October 2011, "Latin Business Association", featured Vizcarra as one of the most active Latino entrepreneurs in the United States, and was recognized for his career in leading SuKarne, in 2014 SuKarne was awarded the National Export Award and Agrifood National Award by the president of Mexico. SuKarne recibe the and its strong push to bring health services to the poor people through Salud Digna.

He ranked 67th among the 100 most important businessmen in Mexico by the business magazine Expansion in 2013, and in 2012 was recognized by the Latino community in the United States (Estados Unidos de Norteamérica) for his project, Salud Digna.

SuKarne the principal company routinely exports to countries located on four continents. In 2014 started exports to Canada, Chile and China.

== Political career ==
In 1988 Vizcarra joined the Institutional Revolutionary Party and served as a state and national political adviser in Guasave, Sinaloa. In 2003, he was elected to the Chamber of Deputies for Sinaloa's 5th congressional district; the same year he was named chairman of the Water Resources Commission and was a member of the Finance, Energy and Budget committees.

Vizcarra helped in the 2004 campaign to elect Jesus Aguilar Padilla governor of Sinaloa. In 2005, he served as Secretary of Economic Development of the Government of the State of Sinaloa. Subsequently, he ceded his position to campaign for mayor of Culiacán in 2007, where he earned the win. On January 1, 2008 was sworn into office.

In 2010, Vizcarra ran for governor of Sinaloa under the Alianza Para Ayudar a la Gente, supported by the PRI, PVEM and PANAL. Although some polls gave him a 6-point lead over his opponent, Mario López Valdez, he lost the election, losing with 46.4 percent to López Valdez's 51.8 percent.
