= Manuel Clouthier =

Mexican politician

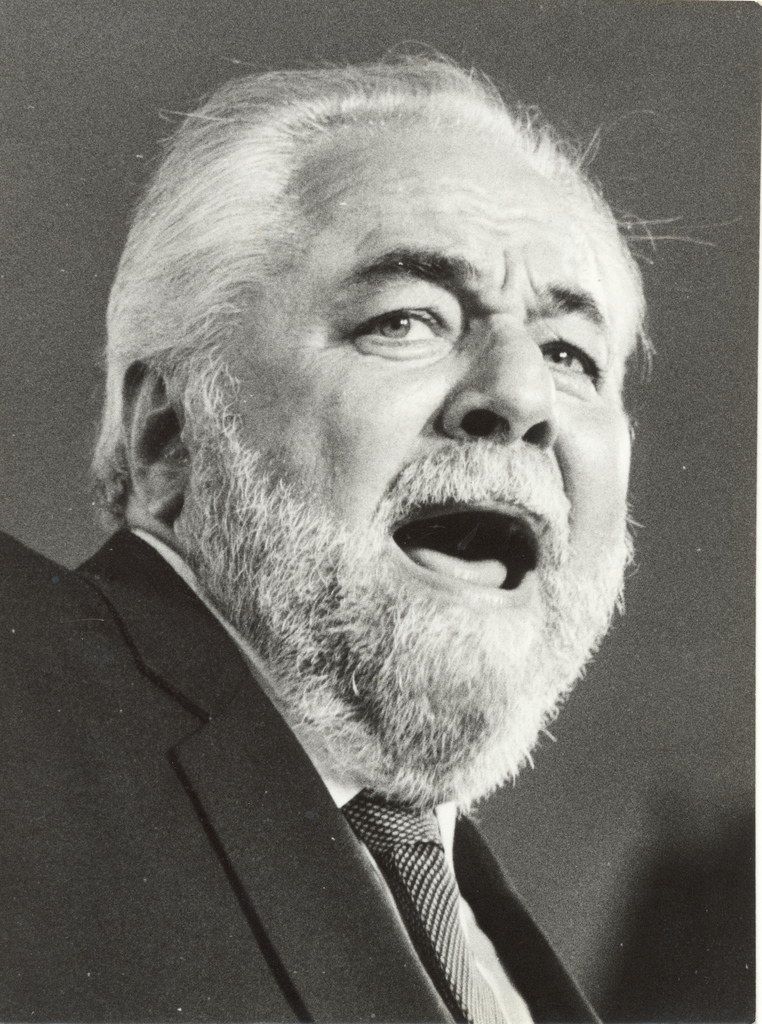

Personal details
- Born: Manuel de Jesús Clouthier del Rincón; June 13, 1934 Culiacán, Sinaloa, Mexico
- Died: October 1, 1989 (aged 55) near Culiacan, Sinaloa
- Party: National Action Party
- Spouse: Leticia Carrillo
- Children: 11, including Tatiana, Manuel, Irene
- Education: Monterrey Institute of Technology and Higher Education
- Nickname: Maquío

Manuel de Jesús Clouthier del Rincón (June 13, 1934 – October 1, 1989) was a Mexican agriculturalist, businessman and politician. His 1988 presidential campaign challenged the dominance of Mexico's PRI party in the nation's politics, with rhetoric and protests before, during and after the elections. Although officially coming in third, he remained a prominent political force in Mexico until his death in a car accident a year after the elections.

== Life ==
Clouthier was born on June 13, 1934, in Culiacán, Sinaloa, Mexico to Manuel Clouthier Martínez de Castro and María Cristina del Rincón Bernal. His family owned 30,000 hectares of land in the Culiacán Valley. He is a descendant of French Canadian doctor Jean Auguste Clouthier, who settled in Sinaloa in 1851.

He became known to friends and family, and later as a political figure, by the nickname "Maquío" which he was given during childhood.

He spent his early childhood in Culiacán, attending primary school at Colegio Cervantes. In 1942, his parents divorced and he moved with his mother and two brothers to Guadalajara. His mother remarried in Guadalajara, after which Manuel and his brother Marco Antonio were enrolled in the Instituto de Ciencias. Manuel was expelled from the school for bad behavior.

In 1947, the boys' father sent them to the United States to study middle school at the Brown Military Academy in Los Angeles. Clouthier left the school with the rank of first lieutenant. He then studied for a short time at the Black Fox Military Institute in San Diego.

He returned to Mexico in 1951 to attend high school at Monterrey Institute of Technology and Higher Studies in Monterrey, going on to study a bachelor's in agricultural engineering at the same campus, graduating in 1957. In 1956 and 1957, he played defensive tackle and was president of the Student Association of the school.

In 1959, he married Leticia Carrillo. The couple had eleven children, six daughters and five sons. One of his sons committed suicide, prompting him to spend more time with his family.

During his political career, Clouthier was heavy set, with white hair and beard. He was often described as fiery, with a blunt and aggressive style, and took pride in talking straight, often crudely. The newsweekly Proceso described him as "Businessman, Catholic, dynamic, vain, efficient, boastful, humorous, foulmouthed, aggressive, forthright, controversial…" According to his son, "Maquío was raised in the social doctrine of the Catholic Church and believed that wealth created a social obligation. He believed in democracy, in the social economy of the market, respecting the dignity of the individual, in solidarity and in subsidiarity."

In his free time, he liked sports, singing, and playing poker and dominos.

Clouthier died on October 1, 1989, in a car accident on the Mexico City-Nogales highway (KM158+100) in Culiacan, while on the way to a rally for a PAN candidate for mayor of Mazatlán. The car crashed with a truck loaded with fruit. Both occupants of Clouthier's car died instantly. The truck driver survived. There were rumors that ruled out it was not an accident but foul play, with several farmworkers reporting a helicopter in the area. The family asked for an investigation to clarify what happened in the accident. Thousands of people attended Clouthier's funeral at the Culiacán cathedral including Dionisio Garza Sada, Mauricio Fernández Garza, Concepción Guadalupe Garza, Ingrid Fiehn, Fernando Canales, Raúl Monter, Alberto Fernández Ruiloba, Javier Livas, Rafael Rangel Sostmann, Porfirio Muñoz Ledo, Cuauhtémoc Cárdenas, Luis H. Álvarez, Elías Villegas, Vicente Fox and Fernando Gutiérrez Barrios. Clouthier is buried at the Jardines del Humaya cemetery.

His widow, Leticia Carrillo Cázarez, died in December 2017 at age 84. Children, Rebeca, Tatiana and Manuel have since gone into politics, initially in his PAN party, and then Manuel went on to become the first Independent congressman. He will contend independently for Governor of his home Sinaloa State. Tatiana served as Secretary of the Economy from 2020 to 2022, and Rebeca quit the party after contending for Mayor of San Pedro Garza García.

== Agro-industry career ==
After graduating from Monterrey Tech, he worked for a time with Paul Williams in Mexicali. He then returned to Culiacán, where his father gave him seventy hectares of land to farm. Here he grew tomatoes, chili peppers, cucumbers and rice. Clouthier was successful with this, increasing his land holdings to 270 hectares and starting fourteen businesses in agroindustry.

== Political career before presidential run ==
His success in business prompted his entry into politics. In 1969, he was elected president of the, Asociación de Agricultores del Río Culiacán. In 1971, he became the head of the Unión Nacional de Productores de Hortalizas. That same year, he founded the Comité de Caminos Vecinales and joined the Movimiento Familiar Cristiano.

In 1971, he was nominated as a PRI candidate to become the municipal president of Culiacán, but another candidate was chosen to run. From then on, Clouthier shifted his focus to opposing the agrarian policies of then president Luis Echeverría, who expropriated lands during the last months of his term. Clouthier organized opposition businessmen, connected with others in similar situations in other states. Although he did not lose any of his lands, he suffered other repercussions and other pressures from local and federal governments.

Between 1974 and 1978 he headed the Consejo Coordinador Empresarial de Sinaloa. Although unknown at the time, he was instrumental in the founding of the newspaper El Noroeste with Enrique Murillo and Jorge del Rincón. By 1978, he had national recognition as a business and political leader.

In 1982, after the nationalization of the banks, he started the México a la libertad movement against authoritarianism, interventionism and increasing control of state of the economy.

The bank situation also had the effect of turning him away from the ruling PRI party to an alternative. By 1983, he had joined the PAN party, as its ideology was closest to his own, but did not publicly announce the affiliation until 1984. Clouthier was instrumental in bringing in new blood to PAN in the 1980s, recruiting owners of small and medium-sized businesses. He also brought in support from women, with PAN organizing groups called “Damas de Clouthier” (Clouthier's Ladies).

In 1986, he was slated as the PAN candidate as governor of Sinaloa against Francisco Labastida Ochoa. He lost but PAN did not accept the results. He introduced PAN to civil disobedience tactics, emboldened by events in the Philippines against the Marcos regime, bringing in Philippine activists to teach peaceful civil disobedience. This made this party more radical than that of the past. These activities had repercussions in the press, with Clouthier and the PAN being branded as “the barbarians of the north” However, it became a point of pride with supports putting bumper stickers on their cars announcing themselves as northern barbarians.

== Presidential campaign ==
Clouthier launched his presidential candidacy in 1987 with PAN and was nominated by the party in November 1987, with 70% of the delegate vote. During his campaign, he toured Mexico with mobile home, with his wife and several of his children. Clouthier was an effective campaigner and his rallies drew large and enthusiastic crowds. As a stump speaker, he relied on a stock of earthy stories, puns, jokes, anecdotes and analogies to get his points across. Ending PRI's dominance on the country's politics became Clouthier's main campaign theme, which also includes calls for greater personal freedom, less interference from the central government in Mexico City and an end to federal monopolies such as the printing of public school textbooks. He had appeal to traditional Catholics in the county. His candidacy was classified as be a new kind of right-wing population or new right for Mexico, distinguishing it from that of the Cristeros and Mexico anticommunists, with a broader message. It was not capitalist, more in line with the socialism of then West Germany.

After a successful interview with journalist Ricardo Rocha, the government-controlled media outlets blacked him out. In response, Clouthier organized a boycott of Jacobo Zabludousky's show “24 Horas” to protest the lack of opportunities for opposition candidates. He also protested the media lockout by holding silent rallies, in which he appeared with his mouth taped shut.

PRI announced on 7 July that its candidate had won the presidential election. At the Federal Electoral Commission a PAN official got ahold of a computer file with the real returns and when discovered, was evicted. The computer crashed and the final results were withheld for a week. Both Clouthier and PRD candidate Cuauhtémoc Cárdenas declared the election results illegitimate. Clouthier signed a document pledging to not accept the PRI victory, but neither would he acknowledge that Cárdenas probably won.

Clouthier and PAN affiliates took to the streets in protest in Mexico City, including a rally to the Angel of Independence that drew about 20,000 people. Clouthier also started a public hunger strike at the same monument, not eating for 177 hours from the 15th to 22 December 1988. After the end of the strike, a pro-government newspaper ran the headline “Maquio Ends Diet.” Salinas was confirmed as president, but after weeks of vote recount, PRI recognized that PAN had won 101 seats in the Chamber of Deputies, a record for the party.

Clouthier remained a prominent figure even after his loss (placing third), until his death. In February 1989, Clouthier presented his “shadow cabinet” to monitor government actions in certain important areas. The cabinet proposed its own solutions to national issues. Clouthier was the coordinator of the cabinet.

Party political offices
Preceded by Pablo Emilio Madero	PAN presidential candidate 1988 (lost)	Succeeded by Diego Fernández de Cevallos
