= Manuel Clouthier Carrillo =

Mexican politician

- Born: 24 August 1961 (age 65); Culiacán, Sinaloa, Mexico
- Occupation: Politician
- Political party: Independent
- Family: Manuel Clouthier (father); Tatiana Clouthier (sister); Irene Clouthier (sister)

Manuel Jesús Clouthier Carrillo (born 24 August 1961) is a Mexican politician. From 2009 to 2012, and again since 2015, he has served as Deputy of the LXI and LXIII Legislature of the Mexican Congress representing Sinaloa. For the final four months of his term in the LXI Legislature and again in the LXIII Legislature, he served as an independent after his resignation from the PAN. He was the only deputy elected as an independent to the LXIII Legislature.

== Life ==
Clouthier was born on 24 August 1961 in Culiacán. In 1982, he obtained a degree in Industrial and Systems Engineering from Tec de Monterrey. In 1990, he became President of Agrícola Paralelo 38 (38th Parallel Agriculture), a company devoted to the production of peppers; for a time in that same year, he chaired the council of Impulsora de Proyectos Inmobiliarios de Culiacán (Promoter of Real Estate Projects of Culiacán). Between 1995 and 2009, he directed El Noroeste de Sinaloa, a newspaper, in which he maintains a 49 percent stake. In 2008, he was a national councilor of Coparmex.

=== First term in the Chamber of Deputies and resignation from the PAN ===
Until 1997, Clouthier had been a formal member of the PAN. In 2009, despite not being a formal member, the PAN placed Clouthier on its list for the first electoral region, sending him to the Chamber of Deputies. In his first term, he was the Secretary of the Oversight Commission for the Superior Auditor of the Federation, and he served on four three commissions, including Public Education and Educational Services; Special for Monitoring of Attacks on Journalists and Media; and Special on the Family.

In 2011, however, Clouthier's relationship with the PAN began to sour once more. In December of that year, the party rejected his bid to run for Senate in the 2012 elections; several weeks later, the TEPJF ordered the PAN to register his candidacy, but he declined to run because of his issues with the national leadership. Ultimately, on March 8, Clouthier left the party, not long after calling it the "new PRI".

=== Independent run and return to San Lázaro ===
The political reforms of 2014 opened the door to independent candidacies for public office, not backed by a political party. Clouthier decided to run independently for a seat in Sinaloa's fifth district, composed of much of Culiacán, and won with 42.4 percent of the vote, defeating PRI candidate Ricardo Hernández.

Among his proposals during his campaign were a reduction in the size of the Chamber of Deputies from 500 to 300, the removal of proportional representation seats in the Senate, and cutting public spending on political parties.

Clouthier currently serves as the secretary of the Chamber of Deputies's Human Rights Commission, and he is a member of the Committee of the Center for the Study of Public Finances as well as the Oversight Commission for the Superior Auditor of the Federation and the Public Education and Educational Services Commission; he had served on the latter two during the LXI Legislature.
