= La Cruz, Sinaloa =

City in the Mexican state of Sinaloa

La Cruz
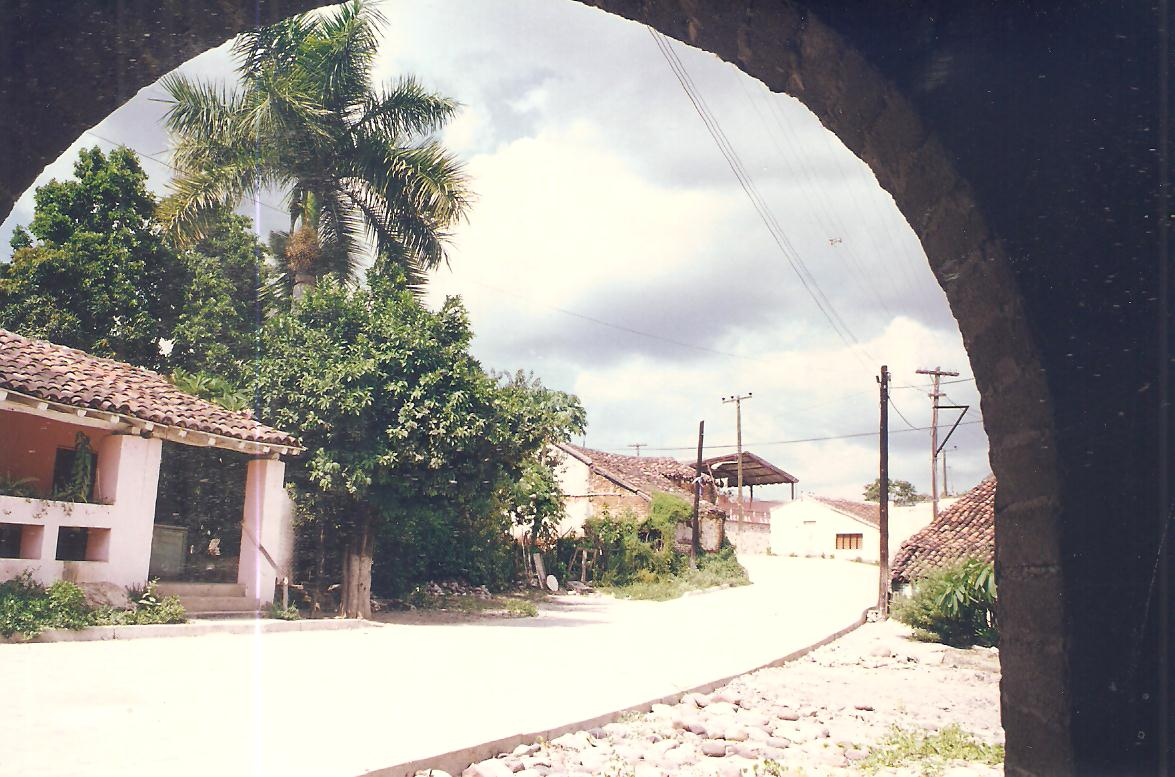

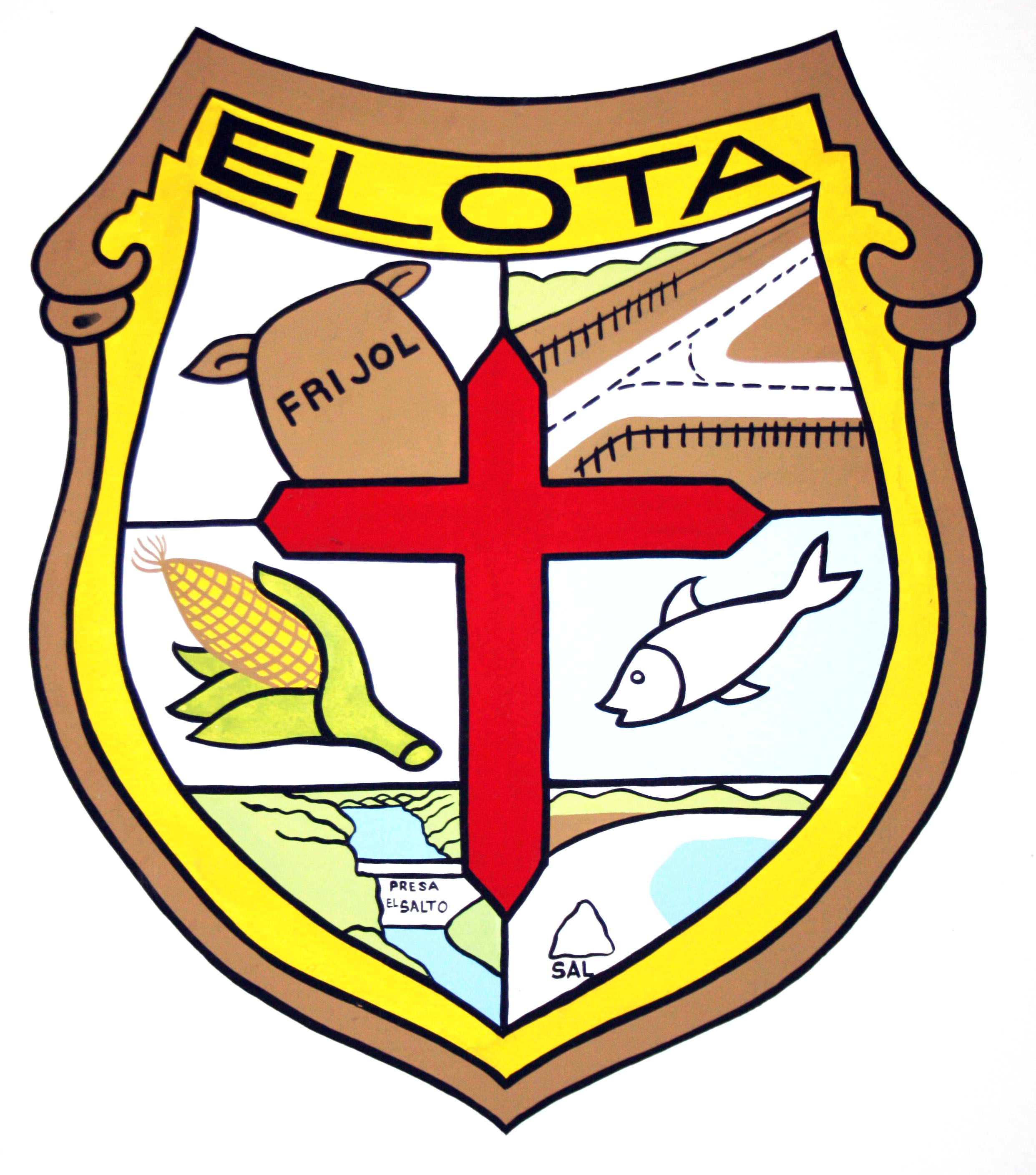
- Seal

- Location within Sinaloa Location within Mexico
- Coordinates: 23°55′17″N 106°53′31″W
- Country: Mexico
- State: Sinaloa
- Municipality: Elota

Government
  - Municipal president: Ana Karen Val Medina
- Elevation: 20 m (66 ft)

Population (2010)
  - Total: 15,657
- Time zone: UTC-7 (Mountain Standard Time)
- Postal code: 82700 to
- Website: Elota Government page

La Cruz is a small city in the Mexican state of Sinaloa. It stands at 23°55′17″N 106°53′31″W. The city reported 15,657 inhabitants in the 2010 census.

La Cruz, Sinaloa, commonly known in Spanish as La Cruz de Elota, is the municipal seat of the municipality of Elota, and is the site of Elota's municipal hall. There are shops and schools, as well as a nearby beach area, better known as Ceuta's Beach, which is located 8 km from La Cruz.

La Cruz is located between Culiacán (the capital of Sinaloa) and Mazatlán (Sinaloa's most important tourist destination and biggest harbor). Culiacán lies to the north at a distance of 120 km (74.5 miles) and Mazatlán to the south with a distance of 100 km (62 miles approximately).

== External list ==
- http://www.sinaloa.gob.mx/conociendo/municipios/elota.htm
