= List of municipal presidents of Culiacán =

The following is a list of municipal presidents of the municipality of Culiacán in the Mexican state of Sinaloa. The municipality includes the city of Culiacán.

== List of officials ==
- Francisco Orrantia y Rocha, 1921–1922, 1925
- Alfonso Leyzaola, 1923-1924
- Florentino Esquerra, 1927
- Francisco Salazar, 1928, 1935
- Guillermo Bátiz, 1932-1934
- Miguel Gutiérrez, 1936
- Filiberto Mora y Ochoa, 1937-1938
- Roberto Mejía, 1939
- Guillermo Amezcua, 1940
- Florentino Esquerra, 1941
- Roberto Lizárraga, 1943-1944
- José Z. Espinoza, 1945-1946
- Roberto A. Hernández, 1947
- Mariano Romero Ochoa, 1948
- Manuel Montoya, 1949-1950
- Manuel Rivas, 1951-1953
- Luis Flores Sarmiento, 1954-1956
- Emilio Aguerrebere, 1957-1959
- Amado Estrada Rodríguez, 1960-1962
- Benjamín J. López, 1963-1965
- Alejandro Barrantes, 1966-1968
- Mario Procopio Ramos Rojo, 1969-1971
- José Mariano Carlón López, 1972-1974
- Fortunato Alvarez Castro, 1975-1977
- Jorge J. Chávez Castro, 1978-1980
- Roberto Tamayo Müller, 1981-1983
- Jorge Romero Zazueta, 1984-1986
- Ernesto Millán Escalante, 1987-1989
- Lauro Díaz Castro, 1990-1992
- Humberto Gómez Campaña, 1993-1995
- Sadol Osorio Salcido, 1996-1998
- Gustavo Adolfo Guerrero Ramos, 1999-2001
- Jesús Enrique Hernandez Chavez, 2002-2004
- Aaron Irizar López, 2005-2007
- Guadalupe de Jesús Vizcarra Calderon, 2007-2010
- Carlos David Ibarra Félix, 2010
- Héctor Melesio Cuén Ojeda, 2010-2012
- Aaron Rivas Loaiza, 2012-2013
- Sergio Torres Félix, 2014-2016
- Jesús Estrada Ferreiro, 2018-2021 and 2021-2022.
- Dora María del Rosario Valdez Páez, 2022
- Juan de Dios Gámez Mendívil, 2022–2026
- Ana Miriam Ramos Villarreal, 2026–present

== See also ==
- Sinaloa state election, 2018
- Culiacán history
