= Armando Romero (painter) =

Mexican painter (born 1964)

Armando Romero (born 1964 in Mexico City, Mexico) is a Mexican painter.

== Biography ==
Romero studied at the Escuela Nacional de Pintura, Escultura y Grabado "La Esmeralda", in Mexico City. From 1991 to 1997, Romero taught sculpture, painting and art history at La Esmeralda. Additionally, from 1991 to 1993, Romero taught art history, design, and drawing at the College Center for Studies in Science and Communications in Mexico City, and also in 2002 taught painting at the School for Visual Arts in Michoacán, Mexico.

In 1998, Romero represented Mexico in the Emerging Artists of Latin America exhibition at the Passage de Retz gallery in Paris, France, and in 2001 he lectured on sculpture and participated in the International Studio Program of the National Foundation for Advancement in the Arts in the United States.

A neoeclectic painter, Romero combines his versions of historic paintings by artists, such as Caravaggio, Rembrandt, Goya, and Bosch, with irreverent contemporary images, allowing emotion and reason free range. Armando Romero, also an accomplished sculptor, is the only artist to have had a solo exhibition at Zona Maco in Mexico City, presented by Tasende Gallery, 2013.

== Solo exhibitions ==
- 2021 Tasende Gallery, La Jolla, CA "Perpetual Provocation"
- 2013 Inception Gallery, Paris
- 2012 Casa Lamm, Mexico City "Santos Recorcholis!!"
- 2011 San Diego Mesa College Art Gallery, San Diego, CA
- 2011 NM Contemporaneo, Art Gallery, CAD Mexico City, Mexico
- 2009 Simultaneous Exhibitions presented at Leslie Feely Fine Art, New York; The MAC, Dallas, Texas; and Tasende Gallery, Los Angeles, "XX Century Parade"
- 2009 NM Contemporaneo, Art Gallery, Museum of Art of Querétaro, QRO, Mexico
- 2008 Alpha Gallery, Boston, MA "The History of Secret Worlds"
- 2007 Tasende Gallery, "Vandalism and Other Irreverences", West Hollywood and La Jolla, CA
- 2005 Galerie Morges, Switzerland, (also 2003 & 2001)
- 2004 Casa Colon Gallery, Mérida, Yucatán, Mexico (also 2002 & 2000)
- 2004 Drexel Gallery, Monterrey, Mexico
- 2003 Morelia Cultural Center, Michoacan, Mexico
- 2002 Loft 523, New Orleans, Louisiana
- 2001 Macay Museum, Mérida, Yucatán, Mexico
- 2001 Casa Colon Gallery, Miami, Florida
- 2000 Sor Juana University, Mexico City
