= Jorge Abel López Sánchez =

Mexican politician

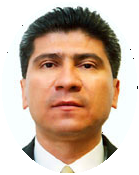
- Born: 8 December 1960 (age 65); Mocorito, Sinaloa, Mexico
- Education: Autonomous University of Sinaloa
- Occupation: Politician
- Political party: PRI

Jorge Abel López Sánchez (born 8 December 1960) is a Mexican politician affiliated with the Institutional Revolutionary Party (PRI).

In the 1994 general election he was elected to the Chamber of Deputies to represent Sinaloa's fifth district during the 56th Congress.

From 2003 and 2006 he served in the Senate during the 58th and 59th Congresses as the alternate of José Natividad González Parás, who had been elected as a national-list senator in the 2000 general election but resigned his seat on 12 March 2003.

López Sánchez was later the municipal president of Mazatlán between 2008 and 2010.
