= San Ignacio Municipality, Sinaloa =

Municipality in the Mexican state of Sinaloa

San Ignacio Municipality Municipio de San Ignacio
- Municipality
- Coat of arms

- Location of the municipality in Sinaloa
- Coordinates: 23.940053°N 106.424834°W
- Country: Mexico
- State: Sinaloa
- Seat: San Ignacio
- No. of Sindicaturas: 8
- Foundation: 1915

Government
  - Municipal president: Dr. Jesús Alfonso Lafarga Zazueta

Area
  - Total: 4,650.97 km^{2} (1,795.75 sq mi)

Population (2010)
  - Total: 22,527
- Time zone: UTC-7 (Mountain Standard Time)
- Website: Official website

San Ignacio is a municipality in the Mexican state of Sinaloa in northwestern Mexico, being the most sparsely populated municipality in Sinaloa.

It stands at 23°56′12″N 106°25′39″W.

== Political subdivision ==
San Ignacio Municipality is subdivided in 8 sindicaturas:

- Central de San Ignacio
- Estación Dimas
- Contraestaca
- Ixpalino
- Coyotitán
- San Juan
- Ajoya
- San Javier
