= Elota =

Municipality in the Mexican state of Sinaloa

Elota Municipality Municipio de Elota
- Municipality
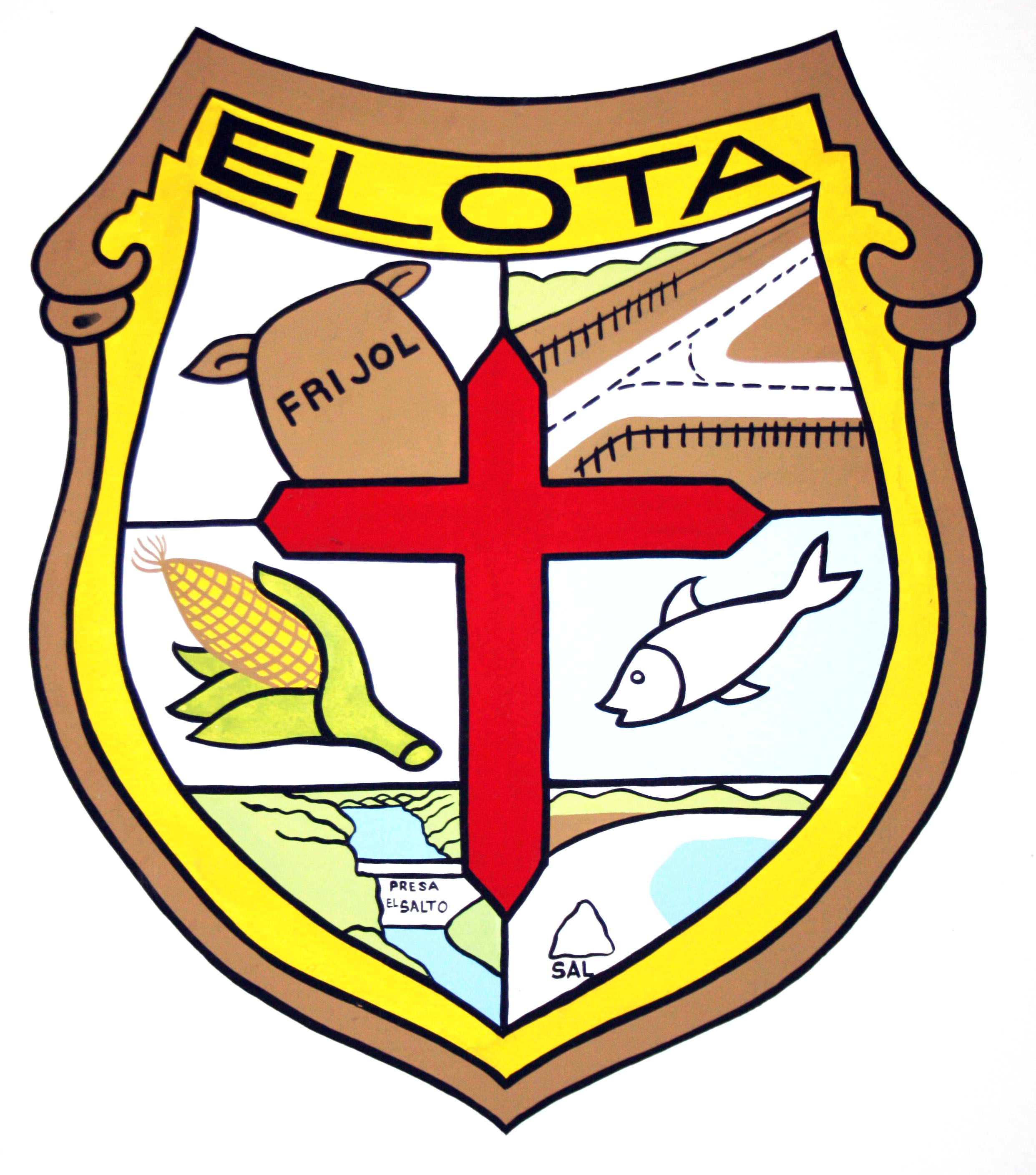
- Coat of arms

- Location of the municipality in Sinaloa
- Country: Mexico
- State: Sinaloa
- Seat: La Cruz
- No. of Sindicaturas: 6
- Foundation: 1917

Government
  - Municipal president: Richard Millán Vázquez.

Area
  - Total: 1.518 km^{2} (0.586 sq mi)

Population (2010)
  - Total: 42,907
- Time zone: UTC-7 (Mountain Standard Time)
- Website: Elota Government page

Elota is a municipality in the Mexican state of Sinaloa. It stands at 23°46′10″N 106°35′0″W. The municipality reported 55,339 inhabitants in the 2020 census.

The municipal seat of Elota is the city of La Cruz.
