= Teacapán Naval Air Station =

Teacapan Naval Air Station Estación Aeronaval de Teacapán
- IATA: none; ICAO: MXNT; LID: ADM

Summary
- Airport type: Military
- Operator: Secretariat of the Navy
- Serves: Teacapán
- Location: Escuinapa Municipality
- Commander: Admiral Guadalupe Juan José Bernal Méndez
- Elevation AMSL: 33 ft / 10 m
- Coordinates: 22°32′13″N 105°43′01″W
- Website: www.gob.mx/semar/directorio-de-mandos-navales

Map
- Location of the airport in Sinaloa ADM (Mexico)

Runways
Direction	Length		Surface
Direction	ft	m	Surface
17/35	6,556	1,998	Asphalt
- SEMAR

The Teacapán Naval Air Station or Escuinapa National Airport (ICAO Code: MXNT - DGAC Code: ADM) is a small military airfield located 2 kilometers east of Teacapán, about 33 kilometers south of Escuinapa, and is occasionally used for general aviation. It has an asphalt runway 1,998 meters long and 40 meters wide and an aviation apron of 90x85 meters (7,650 square meters).

In 2014, the Sinaloa government invested over 61 million pesos in resurfacing the runway with asphalt. This was done to accommodate the Boeing 737 as its critical design aircraft, and to allow for the base of an armed helicopter and 60 members of the Mexican Navy for combating insecurity. The airport is slated to open to general aviation in 2018, and its facilities are planned to be used for drone testing by the Spanish company "Singular Aircraft."
