= Coat of arms of Sinaloa =

Coat of Arms of Sinaloa

The Coat of arms of Sinaloa (Spanish: Escudo de Sinaloa, lit. "state shield of Sinaloa") is a symbol of the Free and Sovereign State of Sinaloa. It was created by the painter and scholar of Yucatecan heraldry Rolando Arjona Amabilis, was adopted in 1958.

== Symbolism ==
The shield is divided into four quarters, which represent the four most emblematic towns of Sinaloa. The upper left quarter represents Culiacán, the capital of the state. On a brown background, at the lower left end, a mountain is represented with a curved tip, according to Mesoamerican iconography. This is the Nahua glyph for Culiacán (literally meaning “Curving Hill” in that language). To the right of this mountain, a blue hand holds a serpent of the same color adorned with seven stars. Together, they are a representation of Huitzilopochtli, the tutelary god of the Mexicas. The serpent with seven stars is the Xiuhcóatl, or fire serpent (the lightning bolt), which is the Sinister Hummingbird’s war weapon. According to the Tira de la Peregrinación, the Mexicas lived near a place called Colhuacan (a word from which Culiacán is derived), and in some interpretations the Colhuacan of the myth is identified with the city of Culiacán.

The upper right quarter represents the town of El Fuerte. On a red background, a tower and a wall are represented. Behind the top of the tower, a white cloud can be seen. Behind the battlements of the wall, a yellow bar appears on which a half moon floats with its points pointing downwards. Below the tower, there are three broken arrows. The group represents several things. On the one hand, it is a tribute to the founder of the city of El Fuerte, the Marquis of Montesclaros. The yellow bar and the crescent moon on a red background were part of this character's coat of arms. The broken arrows represent the bravery of the region's Indians. The wall remembers the defenders of the town before the pacification of the Indians.

The lower left quarter evokes a legend related to the founding of Rosario. On a gold background, there is an orange flame. On the right side of the quarter hang the beads of a rosary, topped with a silver cross that is also an anchor. The gold background, the rosary and the flame represent the legend of the founding of Rosario. According to this story, a muleteer was on the road when he lost one of the mules from his herd. As night fell, he could not look for it and decided to spend the night near the place where he lost it. He set fire but fell asleep. The next day, when he wanted to say his prayers, he realized that he had lost the rosary he wore around his neck. He looked for it, and when he removed the tinder from the fire, he saw that his rosary had melted. He pointed to the place where the molten metal shard had been left with a machete blow. This was ultimately the site where a vein of silver was discovered that allowed the establishment of Rosario.

In the same quarter above, to the left of the rosary, there is a representation of a broken shackle, from which a drop of blood falls onto a white plate bordered in green. The flame and the broken shackle represent the first victories of the insurgents in the War of Independence. The drop that falls from the broken shackle is the blood of the heroes that falls on the white path of freedom and the green of hope. What this set represents is the birth of the Mexican nation.

The lower right quarter represents Mazatlán, which in Nahuatl means "Place of deer" and, due to its meaning, the profile of a deer's head appears, inspired by an indigenous drawing, and two waves coming out of its mouth, symbolizing its bellow. The two islets are found in this place and are known by the name of "two brothers." The anchor refers to the port and pays homage to the sailors who discovered it and named it "San Juan Bautista de Mazatlán" in the 16th century.

=== Elements ===
| Sinaloa to adopt the national shield, on the crest or upper part of the state coat of arms. |

== History ==
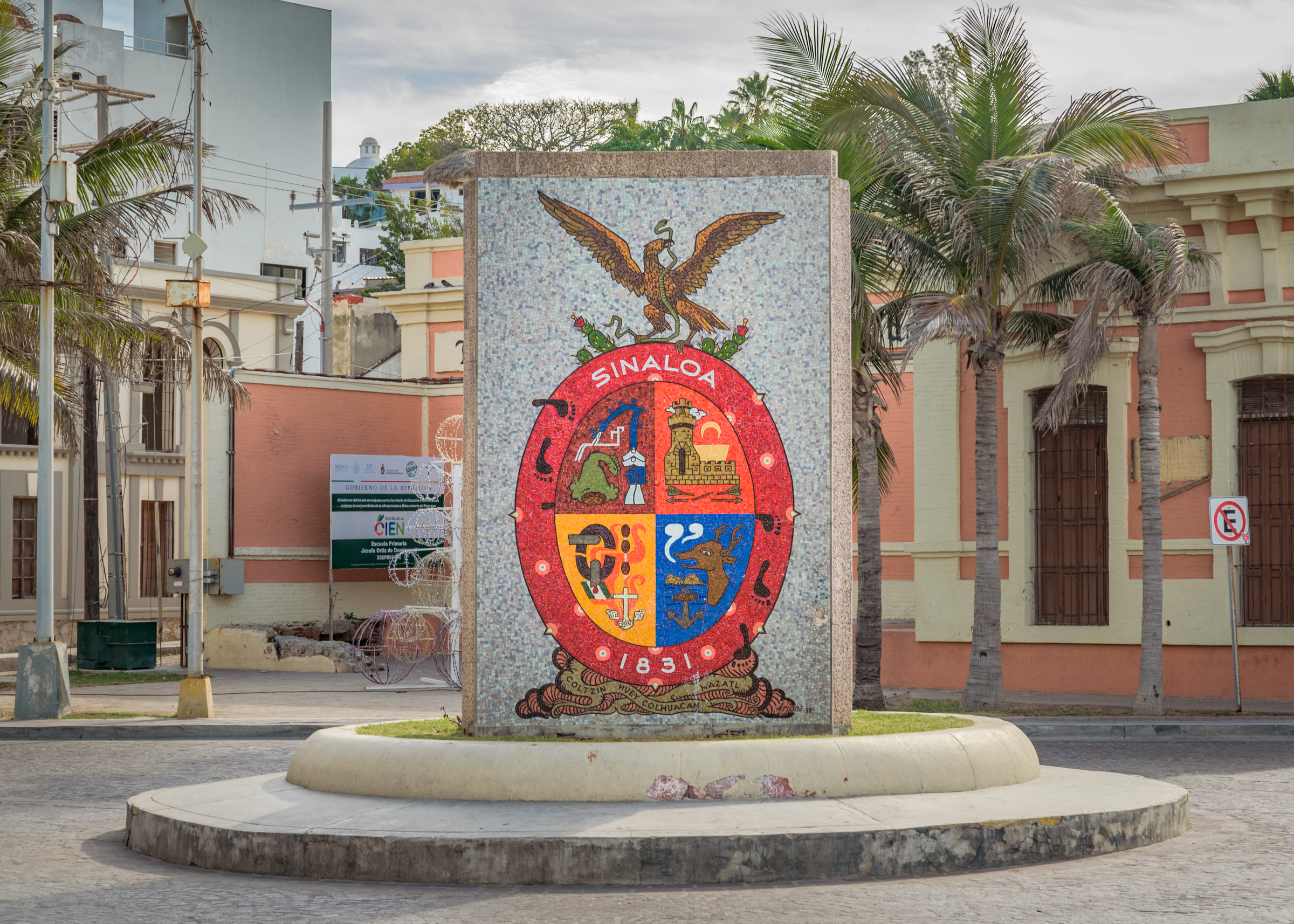
The Coat of arms of Sinaloa in Mazatlán.

It was created by the painter and scholar of Yucatecan heraldry Rolando Arjona Amabilis in 1958. It has an oval shape, which is actually a representation of the pitahaya, a fruit from a cardón that grows in the semi-desert areas of Mexico and that gives its name to the state. For this reason, the border of the shield recalls the color of this fruit, and on it are the regions, on the border there are some star-shaped dots that are the memory of the thorns of the pitahaya. The footprints represent the pilgrimage of tribal populations that passed through the territory of the state. The number 1831 is the year that it was established as a federal entity of Mexico.

The eagle that appears is a reminder of the coat of arms used when Sinaloa and Sonora formed the "State of the West" between 1821 and 1831.

=== Historical coats ===
The symbol is used by all successive regimes in different forms.

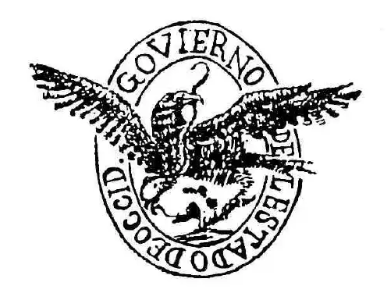
Coat of arms from 1831.

== See also ==
- Sinaloa
- Coat of arms of Mexico
