= Battle of San Pedro =

1864 battle between French and Mexicans

- Part of the Second French intervention in Mexico
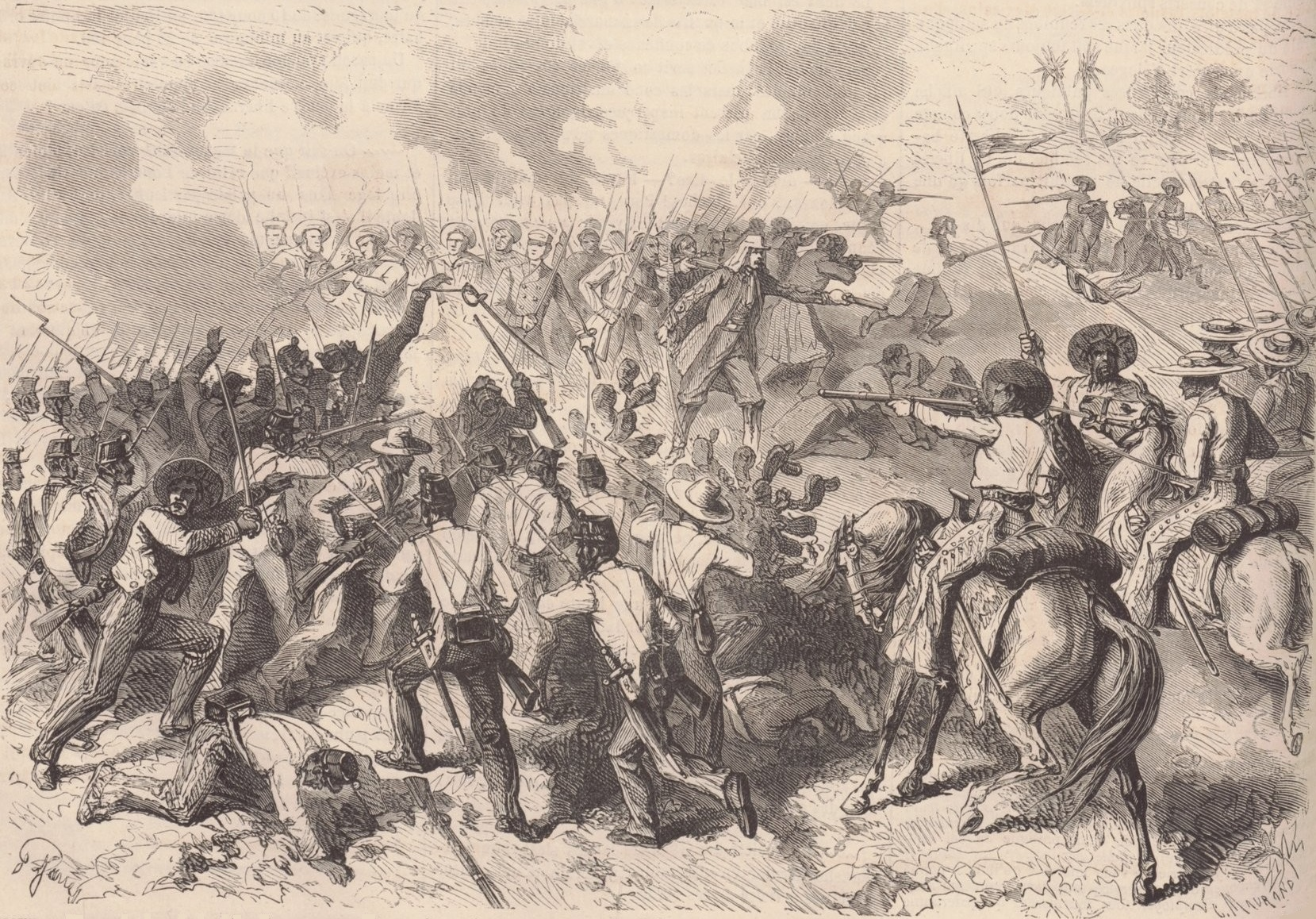
- The escort of General Cortès, commanded by Frigate captain Gazielle, attacked by the forces of Colonel Rosales near San Pedro.
Date	22 December 1864
Location	San Pedro, Mexico
Result	Mexican Republican victory

Belligerents
French Empire (Mexico) Mexican Empire	(Mexico) Mexican Republicans

Commanders and leaders
José Domingo Cortés; Jorge de la Paz Carmona; Véran †; Joseph-Léon Gazielle; Marquiset; Bel Kassem Ben Mohammed; Saint-Julien	Antonio Rosales; Joaquín Sánchez Román; Jorge García Granados; Francisco Miranda; Lucas Mora; Fernando Ramírez †

Units involved
2nd regiment of the tirailleurs algériens	Sinaloa Brigade; Jalisco cavalry

Strength
68 French; 400 Mexicans; 40 marines	400

Casualties and losses
French: 11 dead 42 injured 40 POWs (including Gazielle); 5 MIA; Mexicans: 92 POWs	40 dead

The Battle of San Pedro was fought between the French and Mexican imperial forces and the Mexican Republicans during the Second French intervention in Mexico on 22 December 1864. The liberals achieved a decisive victory over the invading forces and captured the majority of the survivors.

After Emperor Maximilian appointed Domingo Cortés as his commander for the military affairs of Sinaloa in 1864, the Mexican general was still unable to take his office in the capital of Sinaloa, Culiacan, as the road to the city was controlled by Antonio Rosales Flores and his republican brigade. The French garrison at Mazatlán could not provide him a military escort. Reinforcement from Acapulco allowed Gustave-Joseph Munier to organize a security detachment for the general's trip. The captain of the steamship Lucifer, Joseph-Léon Gazielle, was ordered to conduct this mission and was given 64 men of the tirailleurs algériens led by Captain Véran, an additional 40 marines from the warships Lucifer and Pallas, and the battalion of Jorge Carmona, which was trained and stationed in Mazatlan. They were set to sail on 18 December on the ship Lucifer and debarked in Altata the next evening. They needed to march 80 kilometres (50 mi) inland to reach Culiacan. Badly equipped and with only two small howitzers, the following day this small contingent advanced 30 kilometres (19 mi) and reached Bachimela. On 21 December 1864, they reached Navolato, where the rear guard was harassed by a cavalry ambush. The horsemen were pushed back and retreated to San Pedro.

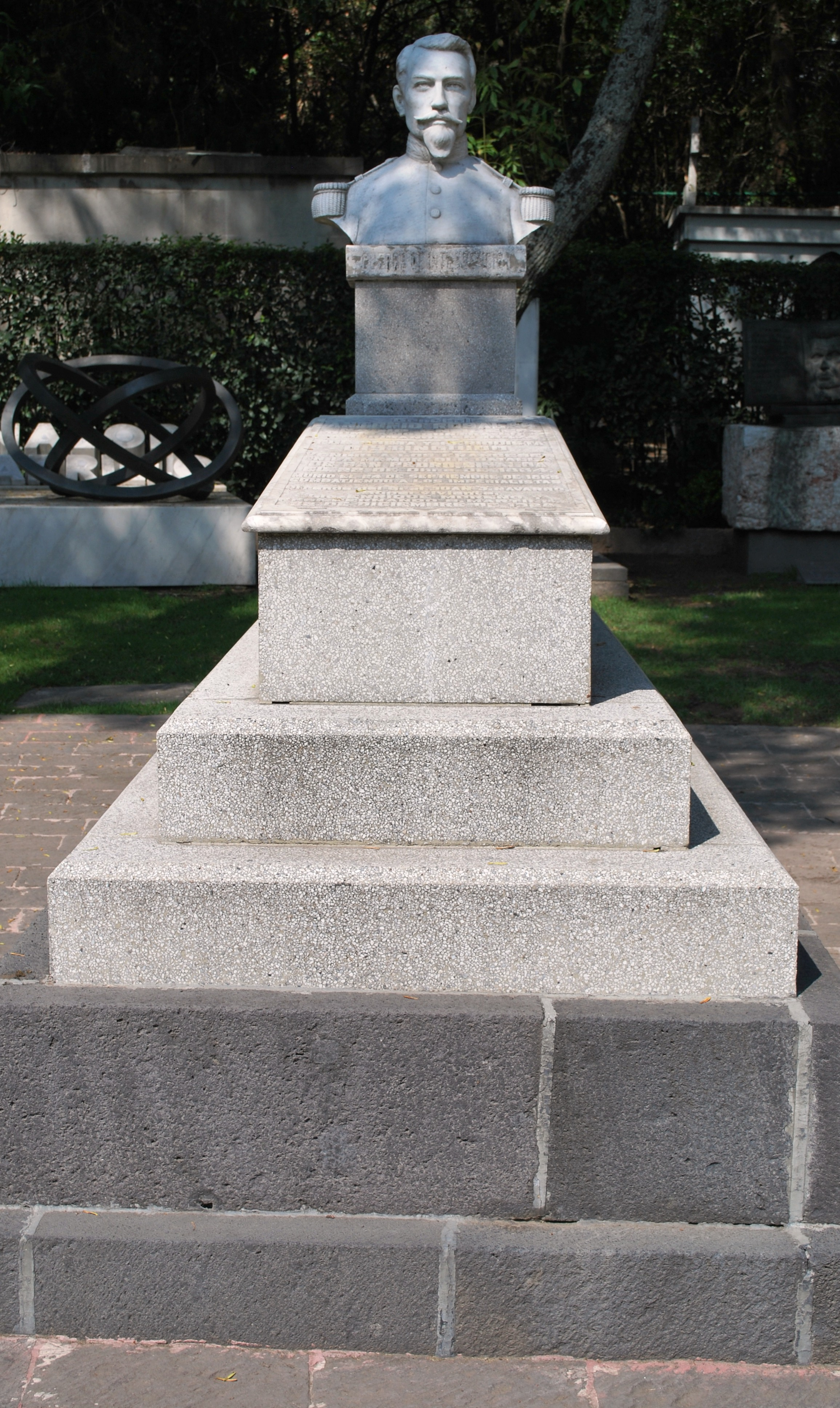
Antonio Rosales, commander of the Mexican Republican Army.

The following day the French force pursued the Republicans through the Humaya River. When they arrived at San Pedro the rear guard commanded by Marquiset was attacked again by the Liberal cavalry. The French again repulsed them and were about to enter San Pedro. The troops of Rosales had already fortified themselves in the front houses of the village. To his left Rosales installed two pieces of artillery and had a half battalion put in reserve with four more artillery pieces. The cavalry was hiding behind the city hedges awaiting orders. The French launched an ill-considered and unprepared frontal assault on the left batteries, which resulted in heavy losses. Despite suffering heavy casualties they finally seized the cannons and thought they had the battle in hand. The Republican counterattack struck the Carmona's Mexican Imperialist division, whose men were mainly new recruits. After a short fusillade, the attacking soldiers started to flee and even defected to the Liberals. Some took up arms against the 100 men of the French column, which was significantly outnumbered.

The tirailleurs algériens rapidly retreated, leaving behind the marines who were overpowered and slaughtered. Gazielle and forty of his men took up a defensive position around the captured cannons. Meanwhile, Captain Véron and his officers fell while trying to protect the French howitzers. As ammunition ran low, Gazielle ordered a general retreat while the Mexican continued to fire on the withdrawing forces. The Mexican uhlans from Jalisco launched three more charges until the French were driven back to the bridge on the Humaya River. Unfortunately for them, the Mexicans had already occupied the bridge. Colonel Gazielle was desperate to cross the river and sought a shallow ford on the river. With the rest of the company of thirty men, they were chased by the Mexican cavalry and he became trapped on an island in the river. Here the colonel decided to surrender. All but one of the tirailleurs were taken to Culiacan prison. Domingo Cortés was able to escape from the battlefield as well. Bel Kassem Ben Mohammed was wounded in the battle and after three and a half months he died of pneumonia at the military hospital of Parral, Chihuahua.

== See also ==
- List of battles of the French intervention in Mexico
