= Licenciado Benito Juárez, Sinaloa =

City in the mexican state of Sinaloa

Licenciado Benito Juárez
- City
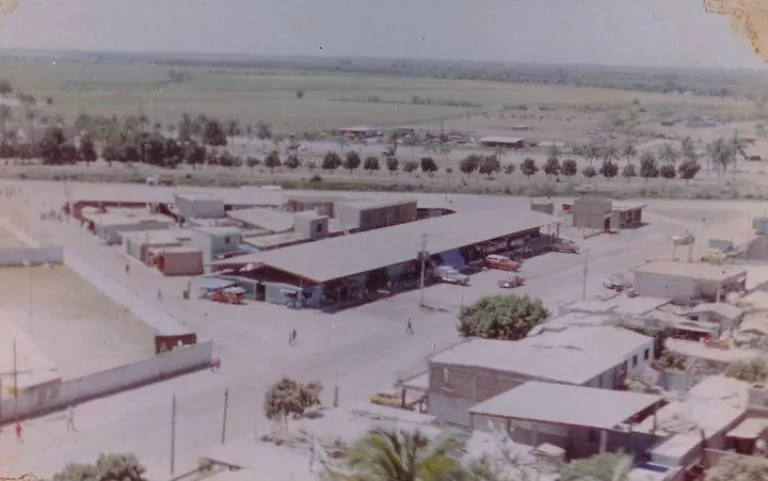
- Villa Juárez when it used to belong to the municipality of Culiacán
- Interactive map of Licenciado Benito Juárez
- Coordinates: 24.656445°N 107.543406°W
- Country: Mexico
- State: Sinaloa
- Municipality: Navolato

Population
  - Total: 21,626
  - Ethnicities: Mestizos
  - Religions: Roman Catholic Church
- Time zone: UTC-7 (Pacific (US Mountain))
- Postal code: 80378
- Area code: 672

Licenciado Benito Juárez or also known as Villa Juárez is a city in the Mexican municipality of Navolato. It has a population of 21,626 and is located at a medium height of 10 meters above sea level. It was part of the Culiacán Municipality until 1982, when it joined Navolato by order of Governor Antonio Toledo Corro.

== Population ==
| Year | Residents |
|---|---|
| 2000 | 20,222 |
| 2005 | 21,690 |
| 2010 | 24,255 |
| 2020 | 33,496 |
