= Altata =

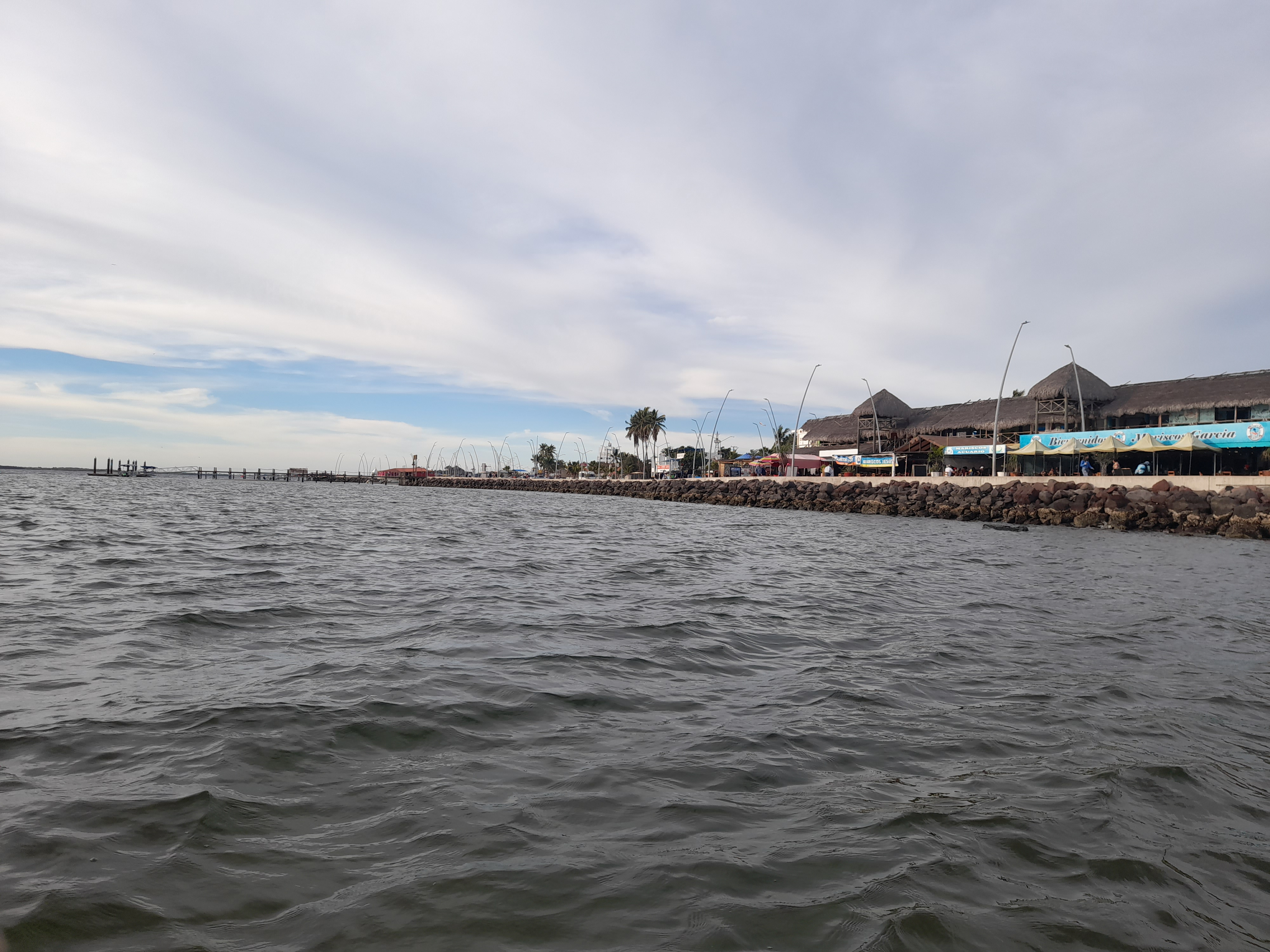

- Location in Sinaloa Altata (Sinaloa)
- Coordinates: 24°38′03″N 107°55′52″W
- Country: Mexico
- State: Sinaloa
- Municipality: Navolato

Population (2010)
  - Total: 2,001
- Website: Official website

Altata is a small town in Navolato Municipality connected to the Pacific Ocean, located about 45 miles west of Culiacán, Sinaloa in Mexico by Freeway 30.
