= Antonio Rosales =

Mexican Army general (1822–1865)

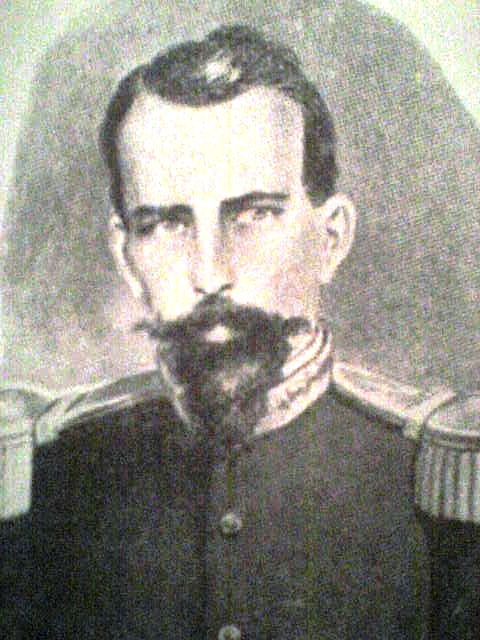

Governor of Sinaloa
- In office October 5, 1864 – March 9, 1865
- President: Benito Juárez
- Preceded by: Jesús García Morales
- Succeeded by: Gaspar Sánchez Ochoa

Personal details
- Born: July 11, 1822 Juchipila, Zacatecas, Mexico
- Died: September 24, 1865 (aged 43) Álamos, Sonora, Mexico
- Party: Liberal Party
- Nickname: Hero of San Pedro

Military service
- Allegiance: Mexico
- Branch: Mexican Army
- Years of service: 1846 – 1865
- Rank: Brigadier General
- Battles/wars: Mexican–American War; Reform War; Second Franco-Mexican War; Battle of San Pedro; Battle of Álamos †

José Antonio Abundio de Jesús Rosales Flores (1822-1865) was a Mexican Brigadier General during the Reform War and the Second French intervention in Mexico. Also known as the Hero of San Pedro for his victory at the Battle of San Pedro, Rosales was the Governor of Sinaloa after overthrowing Jesús García Morales from October 5, 1864, to March 9, 1865, before being killed at the Battle of Álamos.

== Early years ==
He was born on July 11, 1822, in Juchipila, Zacatecas. He studied elementary school in the state of Zacatecas, and upon completion of these studies, he was sent by his parents to the Guadalajara Seminary to continue his high school studies. However, he did not continue his studies as he joined the Mexican Army in 1846 to fight in the Mexican–American War. After the war ended, he returned to Guadalajara where he founded the liberal newspaper El Cantarito. In Culiacán, he later served as director of the Official Newspaper and as Interim Secretary of Government from 1856 to 1857 and was promoted to colonel in 1857.

== Second French intervention in Mexico ==
=== Battle of San Pedro ===
At the head of 264 to 400 men, Antonio Rosales defeated the invading Imperial French army after they landed in the port of Altata in a place called San Pedro on December 22, 1864, during the Battle of San Pedro. For his service, he was nicknamed as the "Hero of Saint Pedro", especially with the outnumbering French army, having 700 or 800 soldiers in this battle. For his service in the battle, President Benito Juárez promoted him to Brigadier General. Rosales then defended the City of Culiacán from the imminent French invasion.

=== The Riots ===
On June 23, 1860, Colonel Antonio Rosales, Remedios Meza, Adolfo Palacio and Ricardo Palacio led a movement trying to overthrow Governor Plácido Vega y Daza but the coup was discovered and the conspirators were sent to prison. Antonio Rosales was banished to Acapulco, from where he fled on July 22, 1861. By April 1863, Rosales returned to Culiacán and was appointed prefect. On the 25th of the same month and year, he and others led a meeting in which they agreed to ask President Juárez not to allow Vega to return to Sinaloa. On May 9, 1863, once again, Rosales led a riot against Vega, which was also discovered.

Banished to San Francisco, California, Antonio Rosales went to ask Vega for help, who at the time was sent by Benito Juárez for the purchase of weapons with the colonel assured him that he wanted to serve his country. Personal matters aside, Placido Vega provided him with money for travel and personal expenses, as well as letters of recommendation addressed to the governors of Sinaloa, Sonora, and Colima. This resulted in Rosales placing himself under the orders of the governor of Sinaloa, Jesús García Morales.

=== Overthrow of Morales and Death ===
On October 15, 1864, the troops of Rosales and Ramón Corona entered Mazatlán to overthrow García Morales. The following day, Rosales was appointed governor of the state by Corona. At the beginning of May 1865, Ramón Corona ordered Ascensión Correa to rise up against Rosales, who had to hide in some houses. A few days later Rosales resigned from the governorship and Corona appointed Domingo Rubí in his place.

Rosales lost his life in combat in the Battle of Álamos on September 24 against the imperialist hosts under the command of José María Tranquilino Almada. His remains rested in that city until 1923 when they were transferred to the Rotonda de las Personas Ilustres, Mexico City however, the original obelisk of his tomb is still preserved in the Álamos pantheon.

== Legacy ==
The State Congress approved a law in his honor that established a secondary school known as "Liceo Rosales" today the Autonomous University of Sinaloa, which is known colloquially in the State of Sinaloa by the nickname "Casa Rosalina" and for this distinction a square located in front of the university in the Historic Center of Culiacán was also named after Rosales.

The capital city of Sinaloa bears his last name to this day, honoring the soldier for his great deeds which is why the official name of the capital of Sinaloa is Culiacán Rosales.

Some compare Antonio Rosales with Ignacio Zaragoza himself, since Rosales also defeated the French on the shores of Sinaloa. The French Army was the most powerful in those days. Rosales, however, has not received recognition proportional to his actions, due to sparse info about his personal life. Little is also known about his offspring as some sources from records states that one of his children raised his family in his place after his death.

Some time later they emigrated to the Mexican state of San Luis Potosí, where to this day scions live with their blood. Rosales retains the blood of leadership, however people talk about his humility that was a characteristic of Antonio Rosales. Teodoro Rosales Serna is a doctor from the Autonomous University of San Luis Potosí (UASLP) and is also known for his close friendship with Dr. Salvador Nava Martínez. Their friendship was so great that the youngest of Teodoro Rosales Serna's children was Salvador Nava's godson.
