= Port of Mazatlán =

Mazatlán
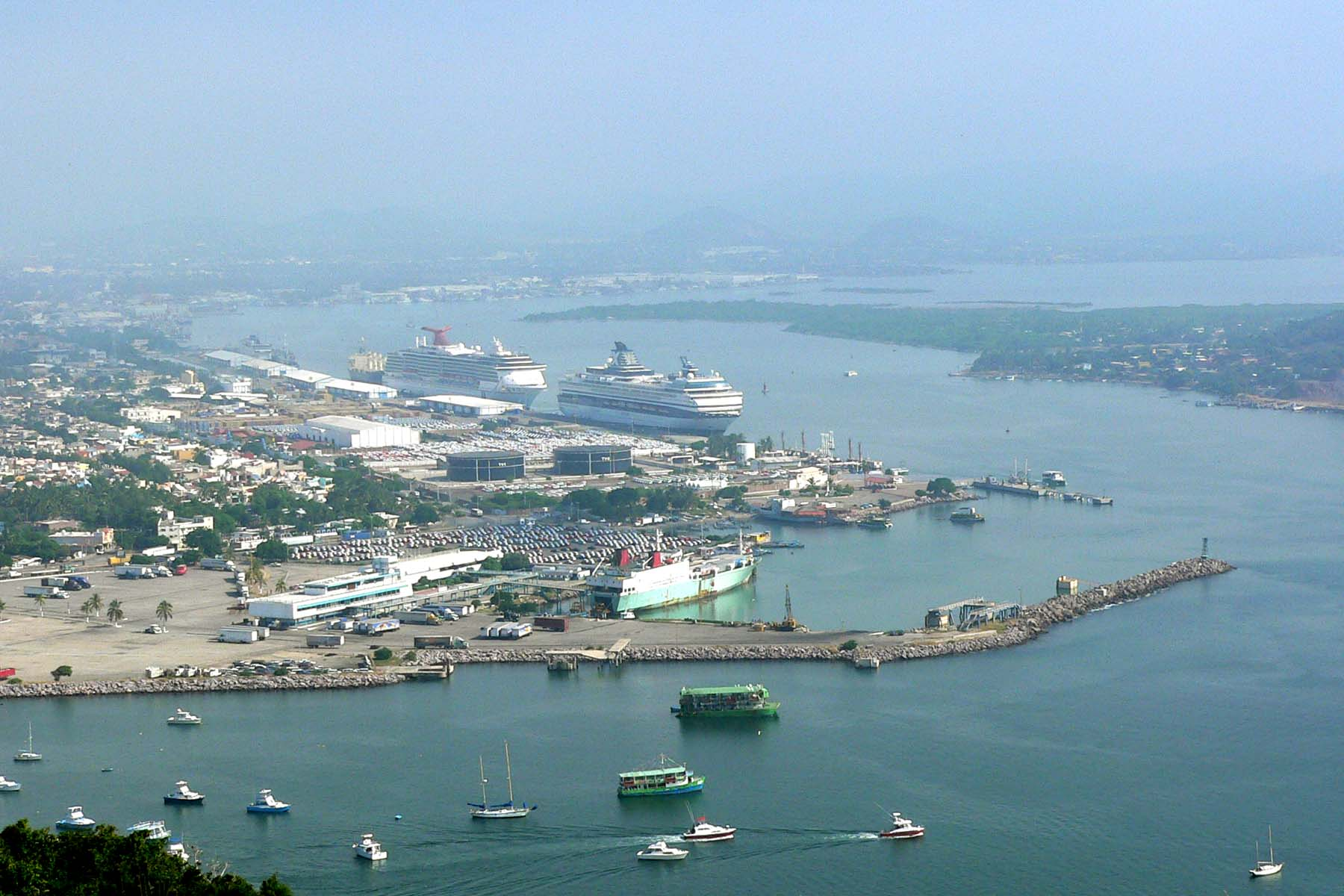
- Click on the map for a fullscreen view
- Mazatlán (Mexico)

Location
- Country: Mexico
- Location: Mazatlán, Sinaloa
- Coordinates: 23°11′N 106°25′W
- UN/LOCODE: MXMZT

Details
- No. of berths: 11
- Draft depth: 11.0 metres (36.1 ft)

Statistics
- Website puertomazatlan.com.mx

The Port of Mazatlán is a port located on Mexico's Pacific coast in the state of Sinaloa, at the entrance to the Gulf of California.

== Description ==
One of Mexico's largest ports, Mazatlán is also the largest fishing port on the west coast. It handles Ro-Ro, dry and liquid bulk, passengers, fish, containers and general cargo.

Two international shipping lines, Mediterranean Shipping Company and Hapag-Lloyd, operate in the port.
