= Sinaloa =

State of Mexico

- State
- Free and Sovereign State of Sinaloa; Estado Libre y Soberano de Sinaloa (Spanish)
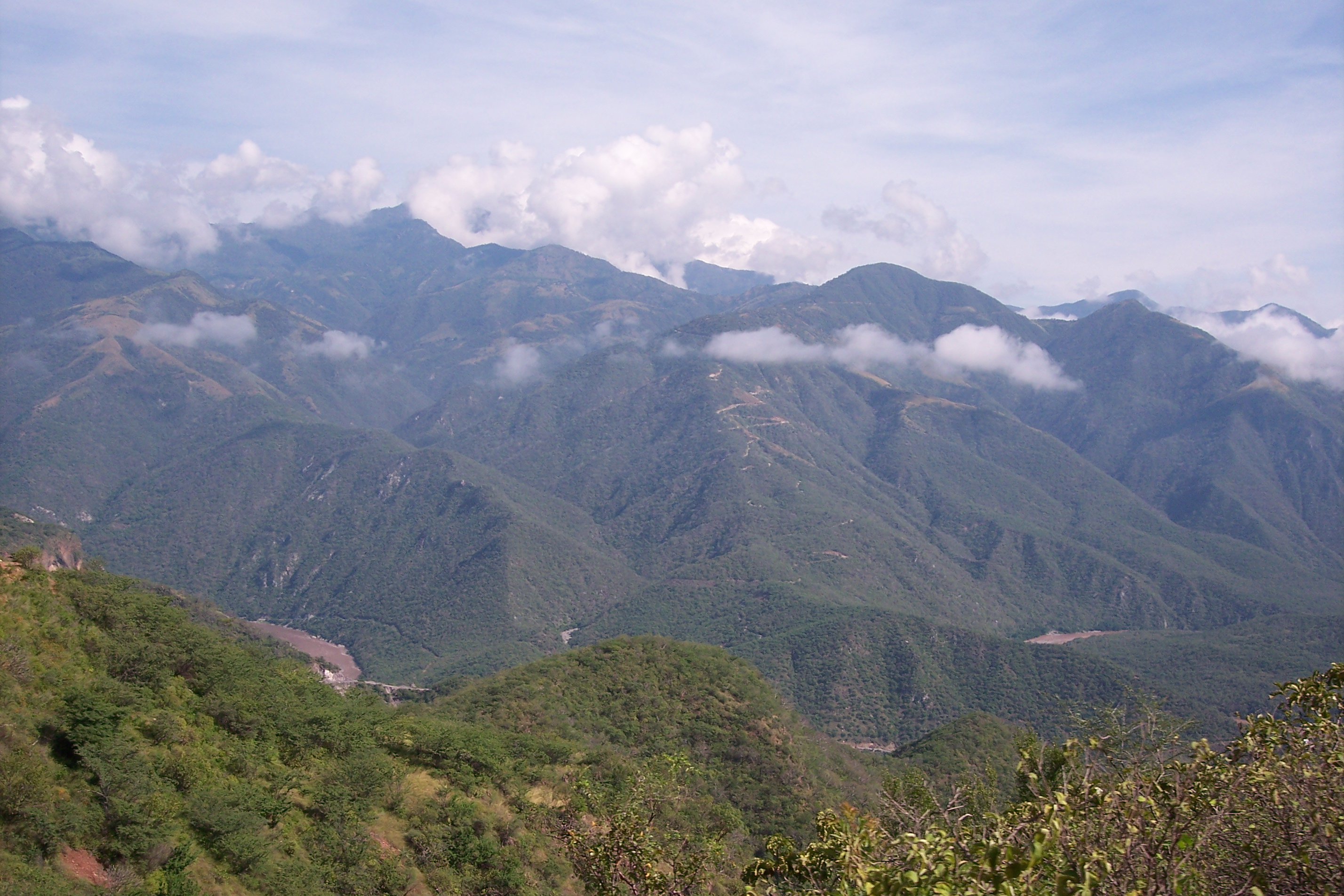
- The Sierra Madre Occidental

- Coat of arms
- Nickname: The Land of the 11 Rivers
- Anthem: State of Sinaloa Anthem
- State of Sinaloa within Mexico
- Coordinates: 25°0′N 107°30′W
- Country: Mexico
- Capital and largest city: Culiacán
- Largest metro: Greater Culiacán
- Municipalities: 20
- Admission: 14 October 1830
- Order: 20th
- Seat: Palacio de Gobierno del Estado de Sinaloa

Government
  - Governor: Graciela Domínguez Nava (interim) (Note: Rubén Rocha Moya, who has a mandate until 31 October 2027, left his office on 23 August 2026.)
  - Senators: Imelda Castro Castro; Enrique Inzunza Cázarez; Paloma Sánchez Ramos
  - Deputies: Federal deputies: • Leobardo Alcántara Martínez (1st); • Ana Elizabeth Ayala Leyva (2nd); • Jesús Fernando García Hernández (3rd); • Casimiro Zamora Valdéz (4th); • Yadira Santiago Marcos (5th); • Olegaria Carrazco Macías (6th); • Merary Villegas Sánchez (7th)

Area
  - Total: 58,328 km^{2} (22,521 sq mi)
- Ranked 17th
- Highest elevation (Cerro La Cueva Gacha): 2,815 m (9,236 ft)

Population (2020)
  - Total: 3,026,943
  - Rank: 16th
  - Density: 51.895/km^{2} (134.41/sq mi)
  - Rank: 18th
- Demonym: Sinaloense

GDP
  - Total: MXN 668 billion (US$33.3 billion) (2022)
  - Per capita: US$10,840 (2022)
- Time zone: UTC−07:00 (Zona Pacífico)
- Postal code: 80-82
- Area code: Area codes: • 667; • 668; • 669; • 672; • 673; • 687; • 694; • 695; • 696; • 697; • 698
- ISO 3166 code: MX-SIN
- HDI: ▲0.828 very high Ranked 8th of 32
- Website: sinaloa.gob.mx

Sinaloa (Spanish pronunciation: [sinaˈloa]), officially the Free and Sovereign State of Sinaloa (Note: Spanish: Estado Libre y Soberano de Sinaloa), is one of the 31 states which, along with Mexico City, compose the Federal Entities of Mexico. It is divided into 20 municipalities, and its capital and largest city is Culiacán Rosales. Other large cities include Mazatlán, Los Mochis, Guamúchil, and Guasave.

Sinaloa is located in northwest Mexico and is bordered by the states of Sonora to the northwest, Chihuahua to the north, Durango to the east, and Nayarit to the southeast. To the west, Sinaloa faces Baja California Sur, across the Gulf of California. Its natural geography is divided by the Sierra Madre Occidental, fertile river valleys, and a broad coastal plain along the Gulf of California. The state covers an area of 58,328 square kilometers (22,521 sq mi) and includes the islands of Palmito Verde, Palmito de la Virgen, Altamura, Santa María, Saliaca, Macapule, and San Ignacio.

Its economy is based on agriculture, fisheries, livestock breeding, tourism, mining, and food processing. Culturally, Sinaloa has a strong musical tradition, particularly in the banda and norteño genres, its cuisine, and the heritage of indigenous peoples such as the Yaqui and the Yoreme.

== Etymology ==
Sinaloa combines two words from the Cahita language: sina ('pitahaya plant'), and lobola ('rounded'); sinalobola was shortened to sinaloa. This most popular etymology is attributed to Eustaquio Buelna. Another etymology attributed to Pablo Lizárraga is Mexica cintli ('dry corn and cob') and ololoa ('to pile up'), and to locative, 'where they pile up or store corn on the cob'. Yet another etymology from Héctor R. Olea combines Cahia sina with the locative ro from the Purépecha language and a from Nahuatl atl ('water'), thus 'place of pithayas in the water'.

== History ==
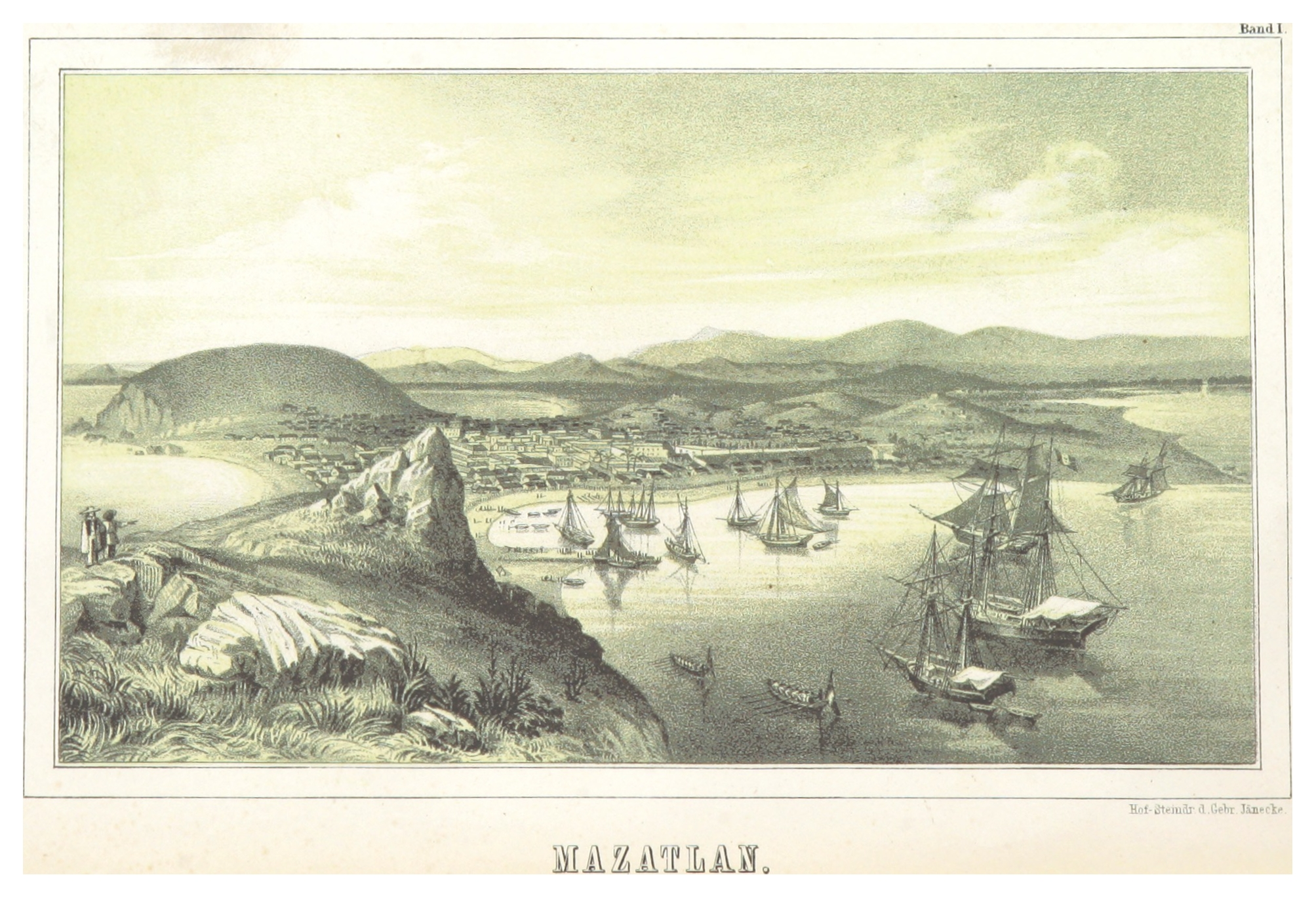
Lithograph of Mazatlán in 1845

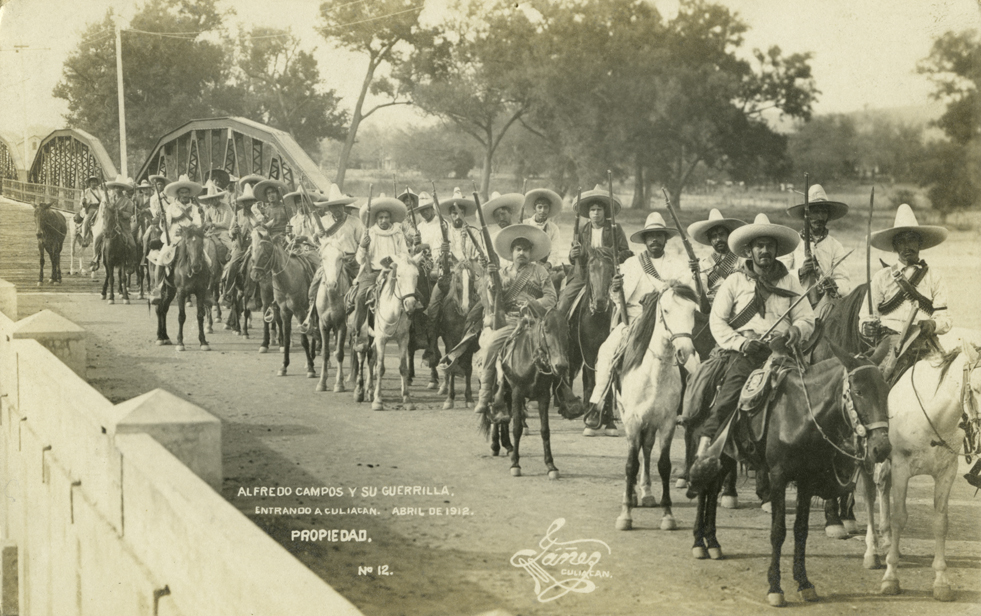
Alfredo Campos and his guerrilla entering Culiacán, April 1912, during the Mexican Revolution.

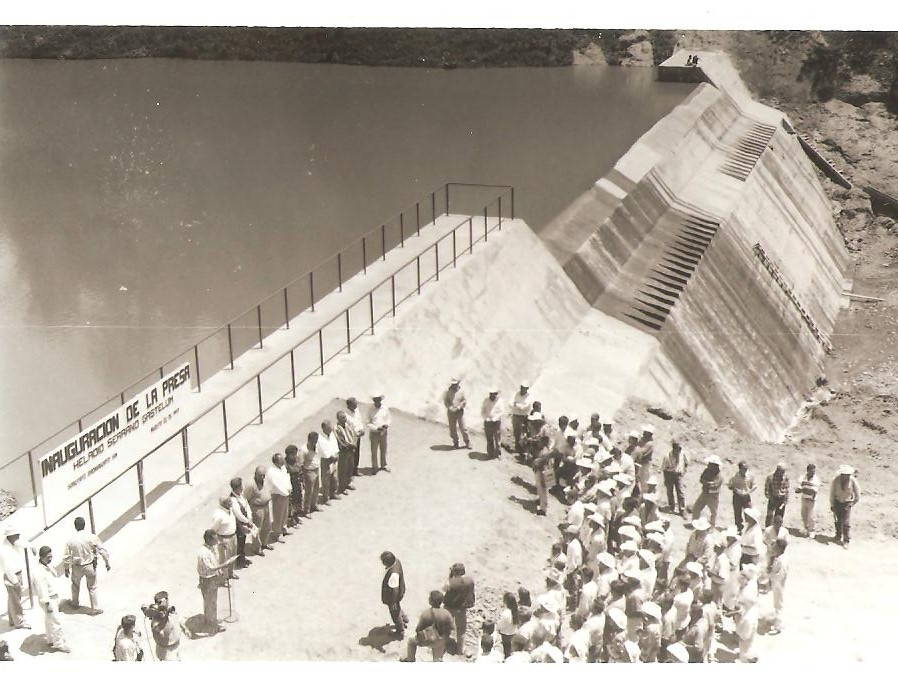
Inauguration of the Huites Dam.

Sinaloa belongs to the northern limit of Mesoamerica. To the north, the Fuerte River marks the region known as Aridoamerica, which includes the deserts and arid regions of northern Mexico and southwestern United States. Before European contact, the territory of Sinaloa was inhabited by groups such as the Cahitas, the Tahues, the Acaxees, the Xiximes, the Totorames, the Achires and the Guasaves.

In 1531, Nuño Beltrán de Guzmán, with a force of over 10,000 men, established a Spanish and allied Indian outpost at San Miguel de Culiacán. Over the next decade, the Cahíta suffered severe depopulation from conquest, smallpox and other diseases brought by Europeans. The northern region of the state was colonized by Francisco de Ibarra, who founded a settlement in 1563 that later became El Fuerte, named after the fort built there in 1610 under the direction of Diego Martínez de Hurdaide.

The Spanish organized Sinaloa as part of the gobierno of Nueva Galicia. In 1564, the area was realigned: the area of Culiacán and Cosalá remained in control of Nueva Galicia, while the areas to the north, south, and west were made part of the newly formed Nueva Vizcaya province, making the Culiacán area an exclave of Nueva Galicia. The first capital of Nueva Vizcaya was located in San Sebastián, near Copala, but was moved to Durango in 1583.

Starting in 1599, Jesuit missionaries spread out from a base at what is now Sinaloa de Leyva and by 1610, the Spanish influence had been extended to the northern edge of Sinaloa. In 1601, the Jesuits' movement into the eastern part of Sinaloa prompted the Acaxee Rebellion. The Spanish eventually managed to subdue the indigenous peoples of the Sierra Madre Occidental region and executed 48 Acaxee leaders. An account of the region's evangelization and colonial history was written by the Jesuit missionary Andrés Pérez de Ribas in Historia de los Triunfos de Nuestra Santa Fe, published in 1645. During the late colonial period, Sinaloa formed part of the province of New Navarre and later as part of the intendancy of Arizpe within the Provincias Internas, a frontier administrative region of New Spain established to consolidate control over the northwest as part of the Bourbon Reforms.

After the Mexican War of Independence, Sinaloa was joined with Sonora as the Estado de Occidente, but in 1830 it separated to become the 20th state of the First Mexican Republic, with Culiacán as its capital. During the Second French Intervention in Mexico (1862–1867), several battles occurred in Sinaloa, including the defense of Mazatlán and the Battle of San Pedro, where republican forces led by Antonio Rosales resisted French and Mexican imperial troops to maintain control of the Pacific coast.

The Porfiriato era was marked by the administration of Francisco Cañedo, who served multiple non-consecutive terms from 1877 to 1909. Cañedo oversaw modernization efforts in Sinaloa, including the expansion of railroads, the improvement of Mazatlán's port, and the promotion of agricultural exports. Los Mochis was founded in 1893 by American settlers led by Albert K. Owen as part of the Topolobampo cooperative agricultural and industrial colony, envisioned around utopian socialism. During the Mexican Revolution, Sinaloa saw early clashes between Maderistas and Díaz's Federal Army, and later naval engagements between Huertistas and Constitutionalists for control of the port of Topolobampo.

In the postrevolutionary period, extensive irrigation projects such as the Sanalona, Miguel Hidalgo, and Humaya dams converted vast tracts of arid land into fertile farmland. State investment, credit, and land reform promoted large-scale production of wheat, rice, tomatoes, and other export-oriented crops, which led to the state being named "the granary of Mexico". Industrial and urban development accelerated in cities such as Culiacán, Mazatlán, and Los Mochis, which became regional centers of agribusinesses, food processing, and tourism.

Beginning in the mid-20th century, poppy and cannabis cultivation took root in the remote mountainous regions of the Sierra Madre Occidental, giving rise to a narcotics economy that would later shape the Sinaloa Cartel, one of Mexico's largest criminal organizations. In 2008, the federal government launched Operation Sinaloa, deploying military and police forces to curb cartel activity across the region during the Mexican drug war. Since then, the state has experienced recurring cycles of violence, most markedly the Battle of Culiacán in October 2019, and the 2023 Sinaloa unrest, when clashes between security forces and cartel members brought the state capital to a standstill. Ongoing infighting in the Sinaloa Cartel has continued to drive instability in parts of the region.

== Geography ==
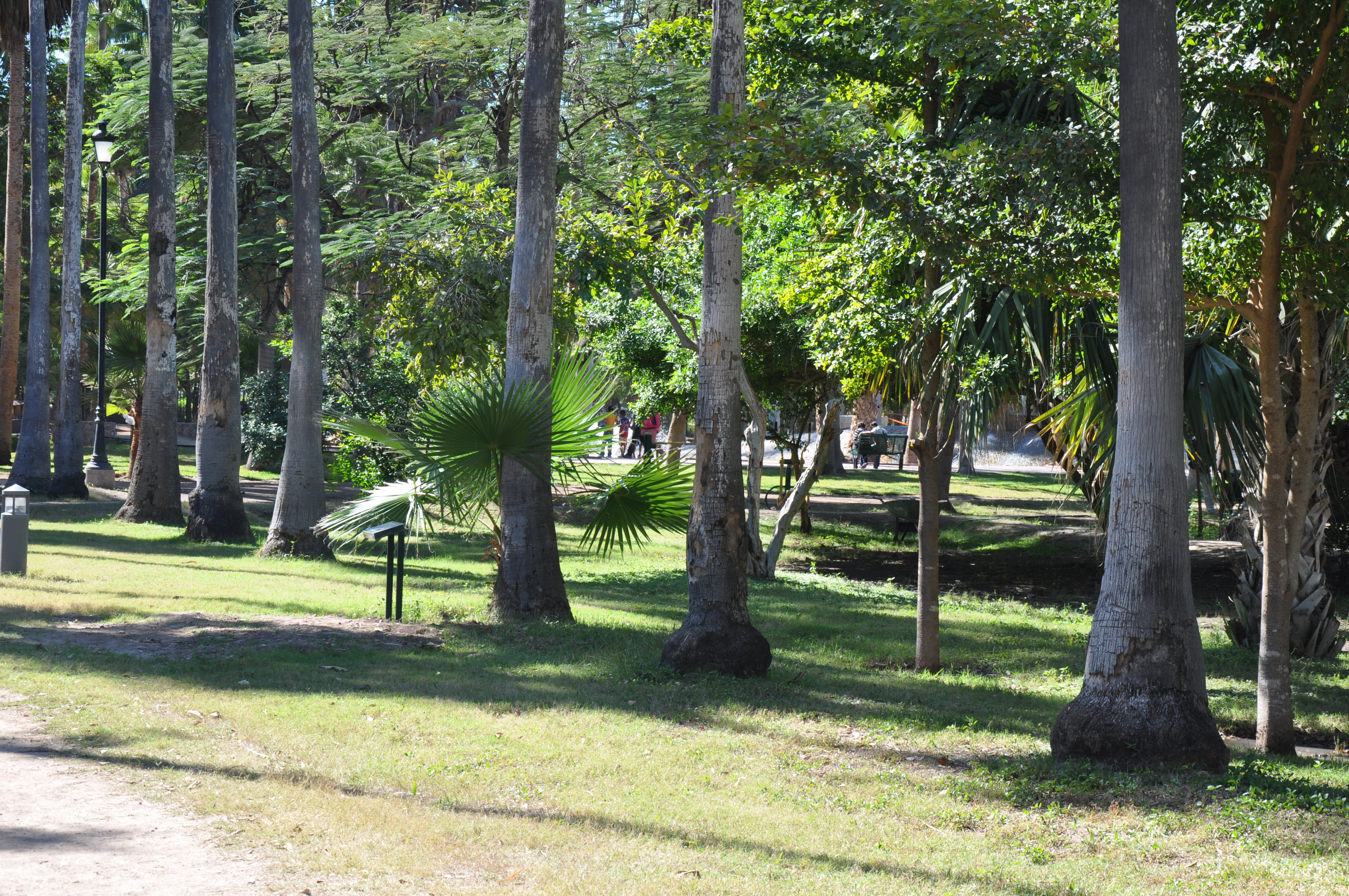
Botanic garden "Benjamín F. Johnston" of Parque Sinaloa

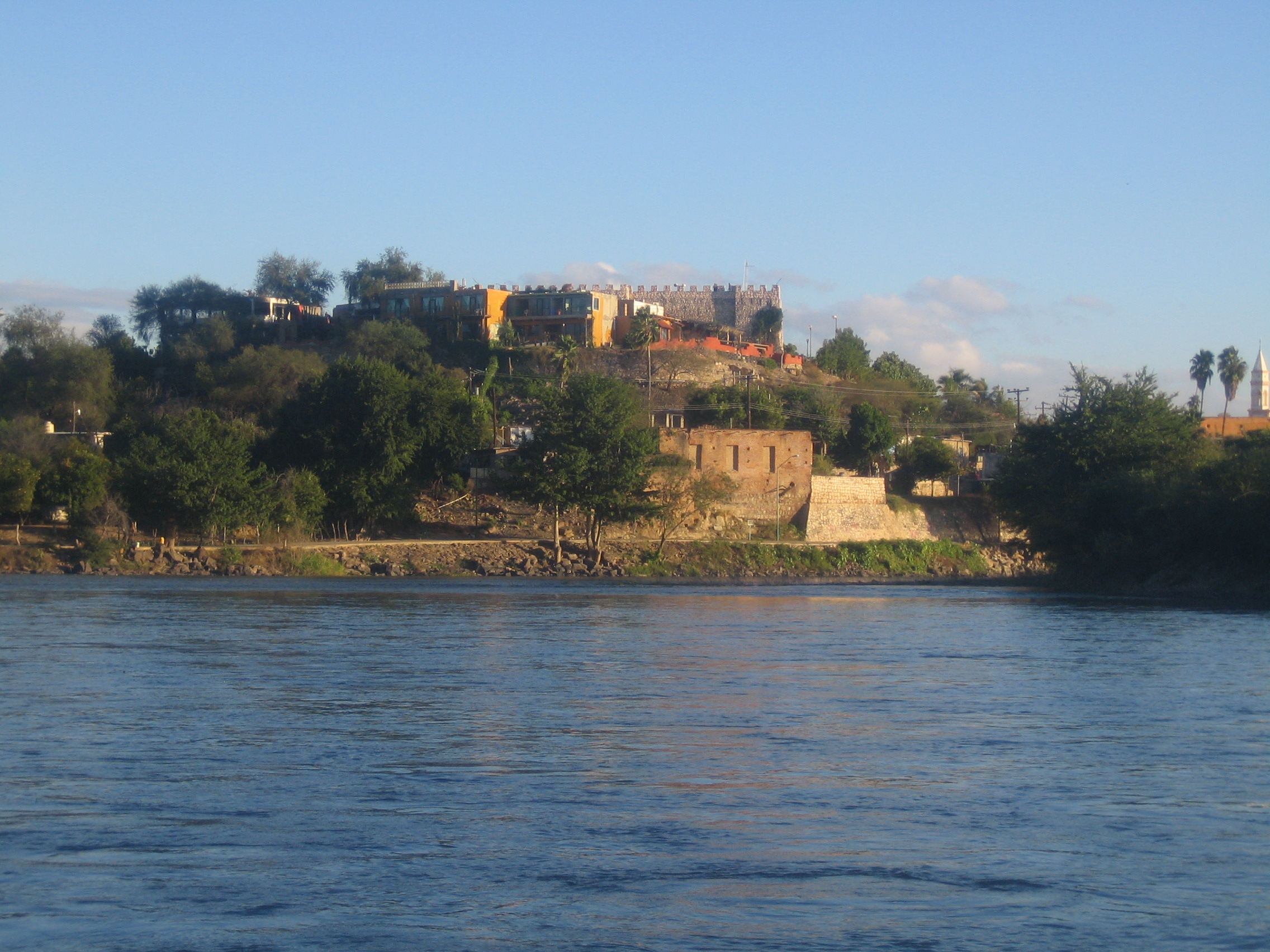
El Fuerte, Sinaloa seen from the Fuerte River

The coastal plain is a narrow strip of land that stretches along the length of the state and lies between the Gulf of California and the foothills of the Sierra Madre Occidental mountain range, which dominates the eastern part of the state. Sinaloa is traversed by many rivers including the Fuerte River, Culiacán River, Sinaloa River, along with smaller rivers and tributaries such as the Baluarte River, Tamazula River, and Humaya River, which flow from the Sierra Madre toward the Gulf of California. These fertile valleys and surrounding uplands form the Sinaloan dry forests and the Sonoran–Sinaloan transition subtropical dry forest ecoregions.

Sinaloa has a warm climate on the coast; a moderately warm climate in the valleys and foothills; a moderately cold climate in the lower mountains, and a cold climate in the higher elevations. Its weather characteristics range from subtropical and tropical on coastal plains to cold in the nearby mountains. Temperatures range from 22 °C (72 °F) to 43 °C (109 °F) with rain and thunderstorms during the rainy season (June to October) and dry conditions throughout most of the year. Its average annual precipitation is 790 millimetres.

Numerous plant and animal species are found in Sinaloa. Notable among the tree species is the elephant tree (Bursera microphylla). Notable fauna include the black-throated magpie-jay (Calocitta colliei), the Mexican bobcat (Lynx rufus escuinapae), and the Mexican golden trout (Oncorhynchus chrysogaster). Reptiles such as the long-tailed rattlesnake (Crotalus stejnegeri) and the black-bellied slider (Trachemys nebulosa) inhabit the drier lowlands, while mammals like the mesquite mouse (Peromyscus merriami) are found across the state’s inlands. Protected natural areas include Marismas Nacionales–San Blas mangroves and Meseta de Cacaxtla.

== Demography ==
Historical population
Year	Pop.	±% p.a.
1895	261,050	—
1900	296,701	+2.59%
1910	323,642	+0.87%
1921	341,265	+0.48%
1930	395,618	+1.66%
1940	492,821	+2.22%
1950	635,681	+2.58%
1960	838,404	+2.81%
1970	1,266,528	+4.21%
1980	1,849,879	+3.86%
1990	2,204,054	+1.77%
1995	2,425,675	+1.93%
2000	2,536,844	+0.90%
2005	2,608,442	+0.56%
2010	2,767,761	+1.19%
2015	2,966,700	+1.40%
2020	3,026,943	+0.40%

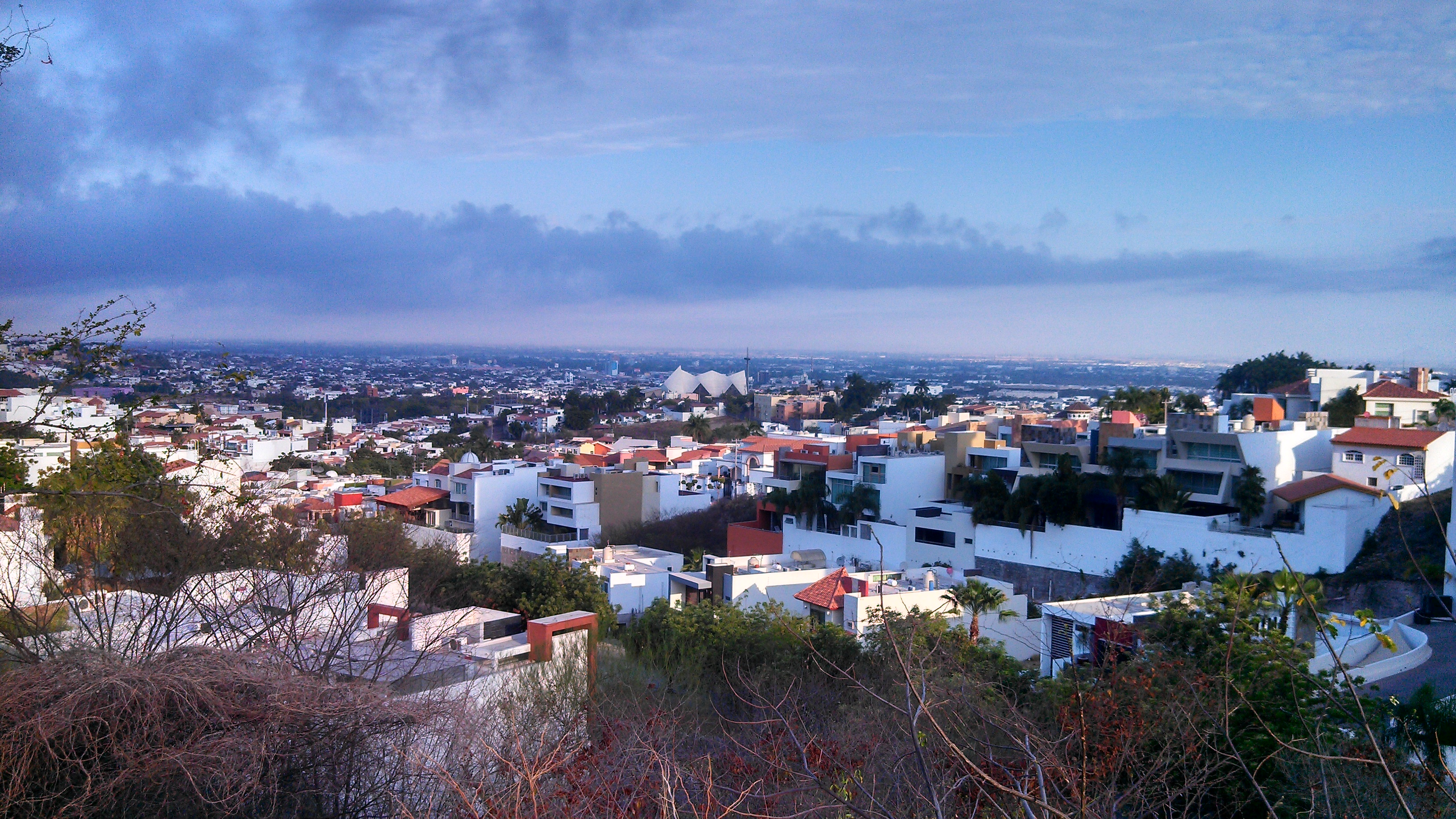
Culiacán

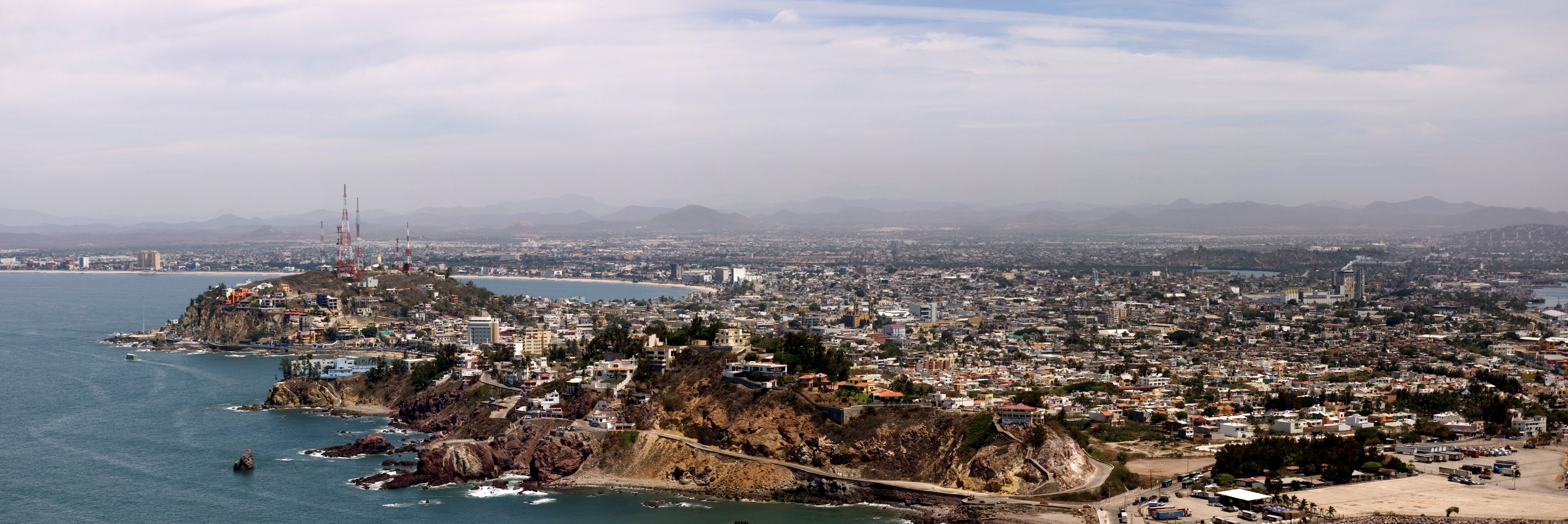
Mazatlán

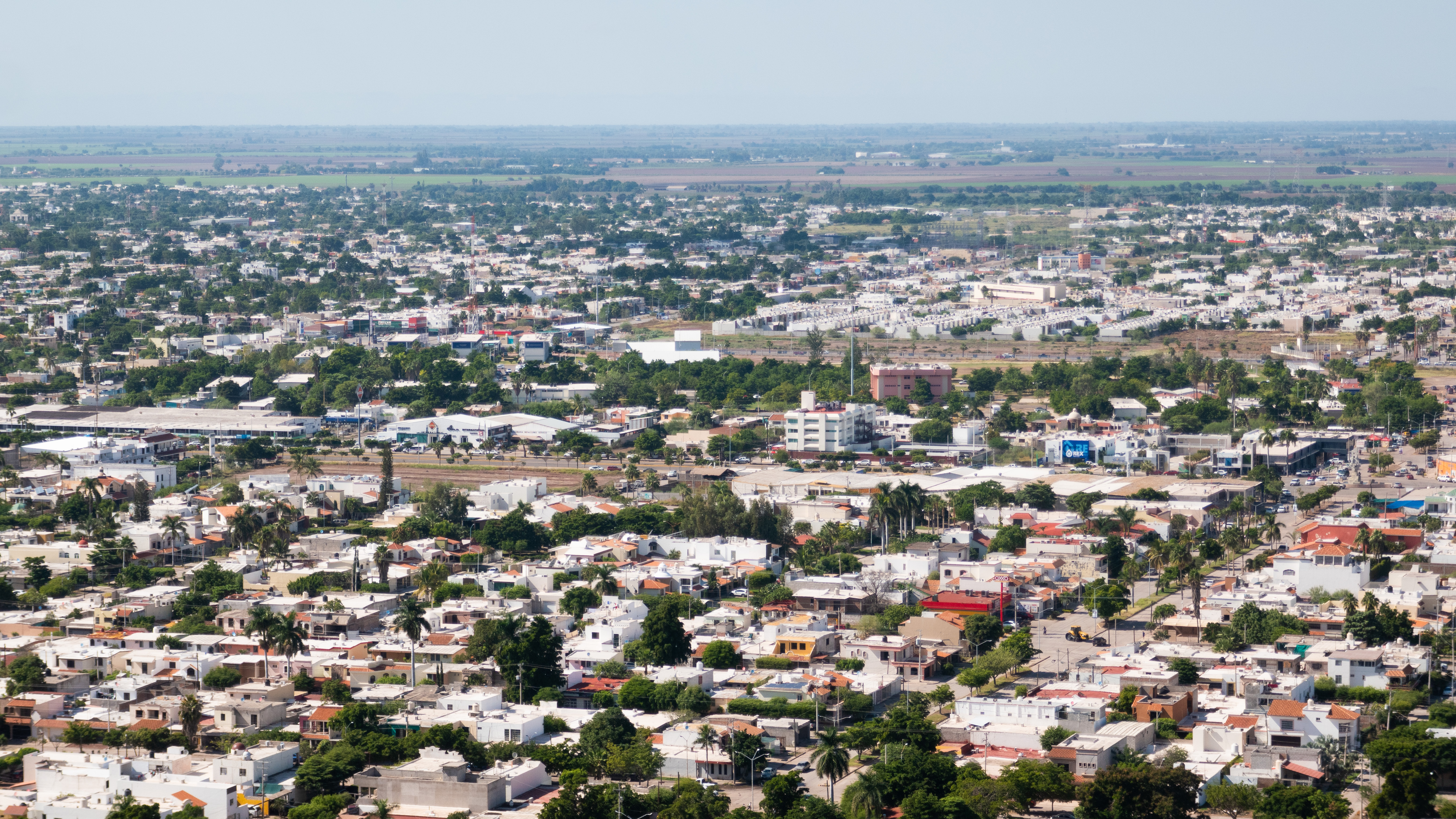
Los Mochis

Sinaloa scores highly in socioeconomic development among Mexican states. In 2023, the state ranked seventh among Mexico’s 32 federal entities in Human Development Index (HDI), with a score of 0.828. According to the 2020 census, Sinaloa has a population of 3,026,943, 60% of whom reside in the capital city of Culiacán and the municipalities of Mazatlán and Ahome. It is a young state in terms of population, with 56% of its population younger than 30 years of age.

Other demographic particulars report 87% of the state practices the Catholic faith. 9.35% identified as indigenous, with 1% of those over five years of age speak an indigenous language alongside Spanish. Sinaloa’s indigenous population includes mainly the Yoreme (Mayo) people in the northern portion of the state, and groups of Rarámuri (Tarahumara) and Yoeme (Yaqui) people. Life expectancy in the state follows the national trend of higher rates for women than for men, with a difference of almost 6 years in Sinaloa: 74.2 and 68.3 years, respectively.

In terms of ethnic composition, Sinaloa has received large historic waves of immigration from Europe (mainly Spain, the United Kingdom, Ireland, France, Germany, Austria, Italy, and Russia) and Asia (namely China, Japan, South Korea, the Philippines, Armenia, Lebanon, and Syria). The last two countries also make up most of the Arab Mexican community in the state. In recent years, retirees from the U.S., Canada, Australia, and South America have arrived and made Sinaloa their home.

There was also a sizable influx of Ashkenazi and Sephardi Jews in the first decades of the twentieth century. Greeks form a notable presence in Sinaloa, where one can find local cuisine with kalamari and a few Greek Orthodox churches along the state's coast. According to the 2020 Census, 1.39% of Sinaloa's population identified as Black, Afro-Mexican, or having African descent.

Sinaloenses have moved to the United States in large numbers since 1970; a large community lives in the twin towns of Indio, California and Coachella, California about 40 km (25 miles) east of the resort city of Palm Springs, California in the Colorado Desert of Southern California.

Largest cities or towns in Sinaloa Source:
Rank		Municipality	Pop.
1	Culiacán Rosales	Culiacán	808,416
2	Mazatlán	Mazatlán	441,975
3	Los Mochis	Ahome	298,009
4	Guasave	Guasave	77,849
5	Guamúchil	Salvador Alvarado	65,215
6	Escuinapa de Hidalgo	Escuinapa	33,924
7	Licenciado Benito Juárez	Navolato	33,496
8	Navolato	Navolato	30,796
9	Costa Rica	Culiacán	28,239
10	Gabriel Leyva Solano	Guasave	25,157

== Government and politics ==
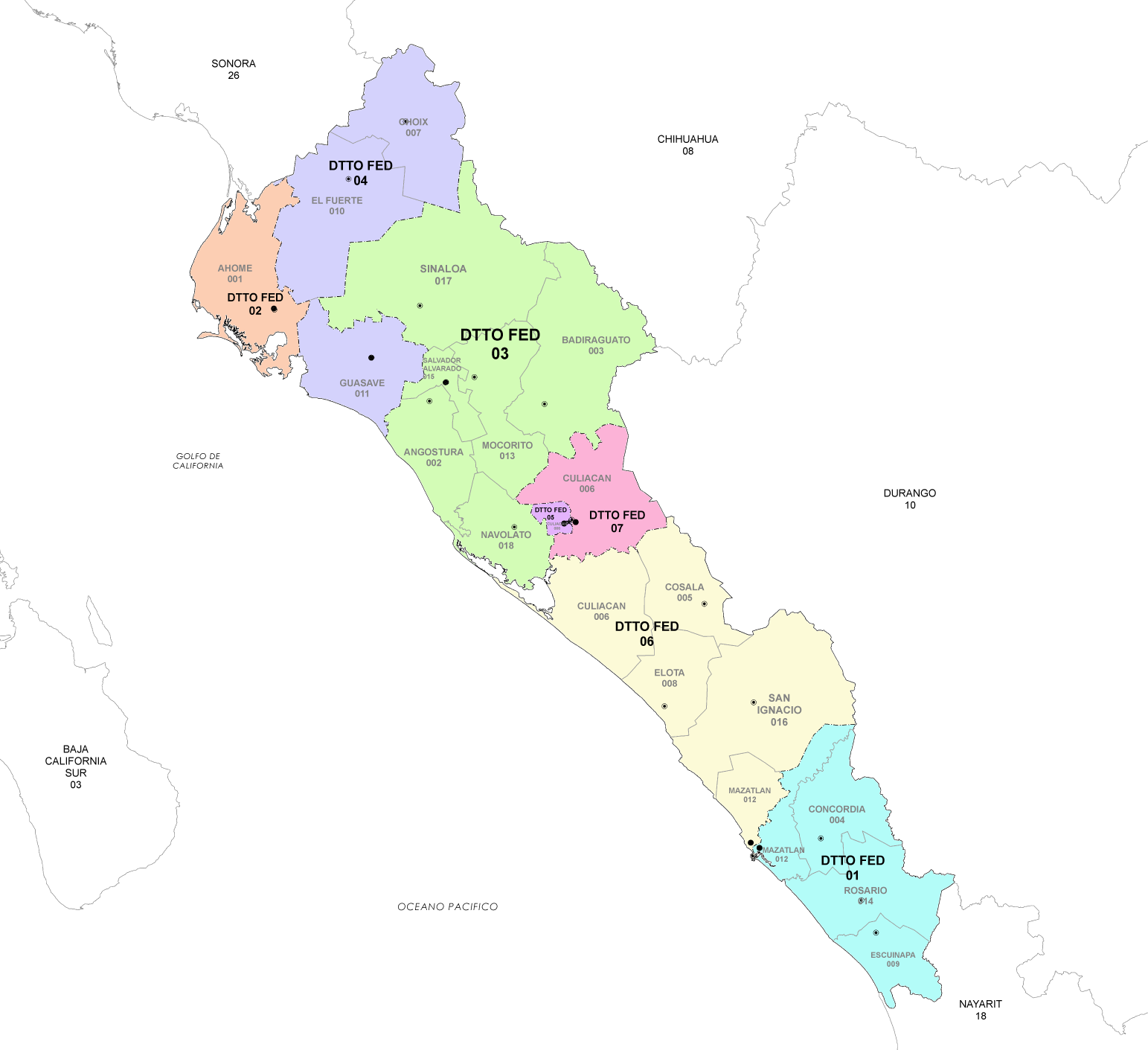
Federal electoral districts of Sinaloa.

The current governor of Sinaloa is Graciela Domínguez Nava, who is serving as interim. Rubén Rocha Moya, who has a mandate until 31 October 2026, left his office on 23 August 2026. The state is represented in the Mexican Congress by three Senators in the upper house and fourteen federal deputies in the lower house. Sinaloa is divided into seven federal electoral districts, each represented in the Chamber of Deputies.

The Congress of Sinaloa is unicameral and consists of 40 deputies (diputados). 24 deputies are elected on a first-past-the-post basis, one for each district in which the entity is divided, while 16 are elected through a system of proportional representation. Deputies are elected to serve for a three-year term.

=== Municipalities ===
Sinaloa is subdivided into 20 municipios. Each municipality has a city council (ayuntamiento), headed by the municipal president. Municipalities in Sinaloa have some administrative autonomy from the state according to the 115th article of the 1917 Constitution of Mexico. Every three years, citizens elect a municipal president (Spanish: presidente municipal) by a plurality voting system who heads a concurrently elected municipal council (ayuntamiento) responsible for providing all the public services for their constituents. The municipal council consists of a variable number of trustees and councillors (regidores y síndicos). Municipalities are responsible for public services (such as water and sewerage), street lighting, public safety, traffic, and the maintenance of public parks, gardens and cemeteries. They may also assist the state and federal governments in education, emergency fire and medical services, environmental protection and maintenance of monuments and historical landmarks. Since 1984, they have had the power to collect property taxes and user fees, although more funds are obtained from the state and federal governments than from their own income.

Municipalities of the State of Sinaloa (2020)
Municipalities of Sinaloa
Number	Municipality	Municipal Seat	Number	Municipality	Municipal Seat
001	Ahome	Los Mochis	011	Escuinapa	Escuinapa de Hidalgo
002	Angostura	Angostura	012	Guasave	Guasave
003	Badiraguato	Badiraguato	013	Juan José Ríos	Juan José Ríos
004	Concordia	Concordia	014	Mazatlán	Mazatlán
005	Cosalá	Cosalá	015	Mocorito	Mocorito
006	Culiacán	Culiacán Rosales	016	Navolato	Navolato
007	Choix	Choix	017	Rosario	El Rosario
008	Eldorado	Eldorado	018	Salvador Alvarado	Guamúchil
009	Elota	La Cruz	019	San Ignacio	San Ignacio de Piaxtla
010	El Fuerte	El Fuerte	020	Sinaloa	Sinaloa de Leyva

The state's major cities include the capital and largest city, Culiacán; Mazatlán, a famous tourist resort and destination; and Los Mochis, an agricultural hub in Northwestern Mexico. Other cities include Guasave, Guamúchil, Escuinapa, El Fuerte, Sinaloa de Leyva, El Rosario, San Ignacio de Piaxtla and Choix.

== Economy ==
As of 2022, Sinaloa had a nominal GDP of approximately 668 billion pesos (US $33 billion), representing about 2.35% of Mexico’s national total, with a GDP per capita of US $10,840 and a PPP per capita of US $ 22,630. The main economic activities of Sinaloa are agriculture, fishing, livestock breeding, tourism and food processing. Sinaloa has on its license plates the image of a tomato, as the state is widely recognized for harvesting this particular fruit in great abundance from Los Mochis in the North to Culiacán in the central region of the state. Agriculture produce aside from tomatoes include cotton, beans, corn, wheat, sorghum, potatoes, soybeans, mangos, sugarcane, peanuts and squash. Sinaloa is the most prominent state in Mexico in terms of agriculture and is known as "Mexico's breadbasket". Livestock produce meat, sausages, cheese, milk, and sour cream. Additionally, Sinaloa has the second-largest fishing fleet in the country. Tourism plays an important role in Sinaloa’s economy, driven by destinations such as Mazatlán, known for its beaches, historic center, and its carnival, along with ecotourism. Mining has long been an important part of the economy, with zinc, gold, silver, lead, manganese, and other mineral deposits extracted in the Sierra Madre Occidental with mining centers such as Cosalá, Concordia, and El Rosario dating back to the colonial period. Sinaloa hosts major national companies including Sukarne, Coppel, and Casa Ley.

== Education ==
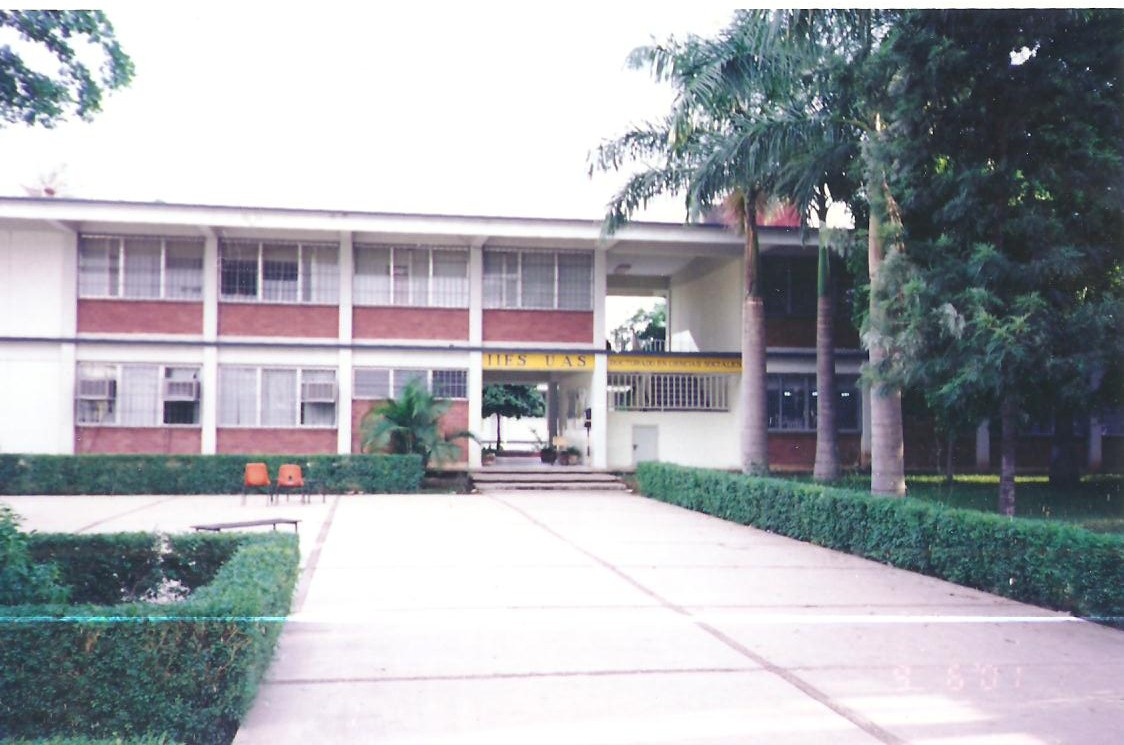
Autonomous University of Sinaloa's campus in Culiacán

In terms of education, average schooling is 8.27 years; 4.2% of those aged 15 or older are illiterate, and 3.18% of children under 14 do not attend school. The state's literacy rate in 2020 was 96.3%.

The Autonomous University of Sinaloa (UAS), founded in 1873 as the Liceo Rosales, and attaining full autonomy in 1965, is the state's main public university and the largest, with multiple campuses across the state. Other institutions of higher education include Universidad Autónoma de Sinaloa, Mexico International University, TecMilenio University, Universidad Autónoma de Durango, Universidad Autónoma de Occidente, Universidad Autónoma Indígena de México, and Universidad Casa Blanca.

== Transportation ==
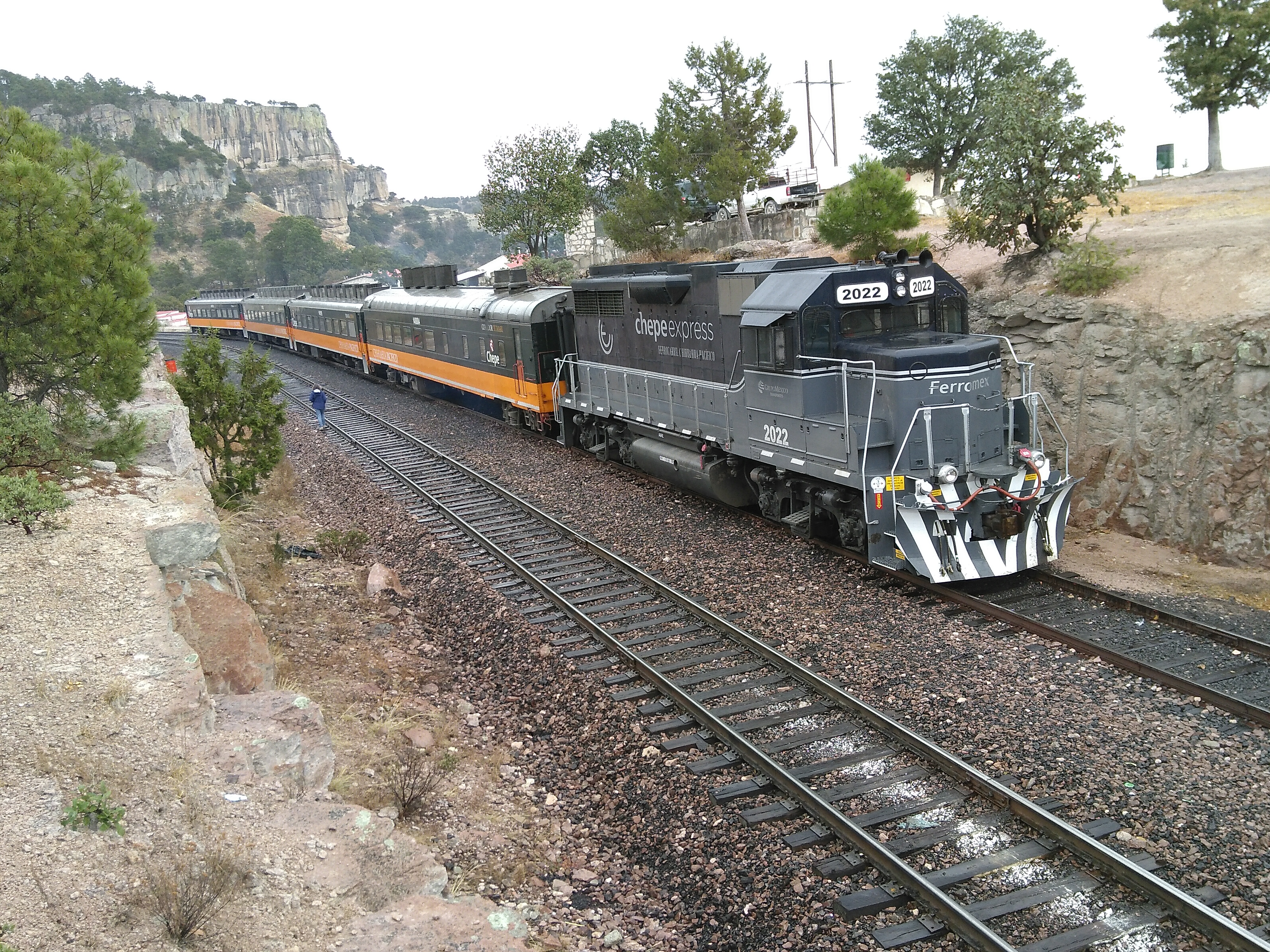
The Chihuahua–Pacific Railway

Sinaloa’s infrastructure includes major highways such as the Mexican Federal Highway 15 and Highway 40, international airports in Culiacán, in Mazatlán, and in Los Mochis. The Ferromex-operated Chihuahua–Pacific rail line connects the cities of Los Mochis and Chihuahua. The Port of Mazatlán and Topolobampo are among the largest Mexican ports in the Pacific, supporting trade and tourism. The Baluarte Bridge, located between the municipalities of Concordia in Sinaloa and Pueblo Nuevo in Durango, is the third-highest cable-stayed bridge in the world and the highest bridge in the Americas.

== Culture ==
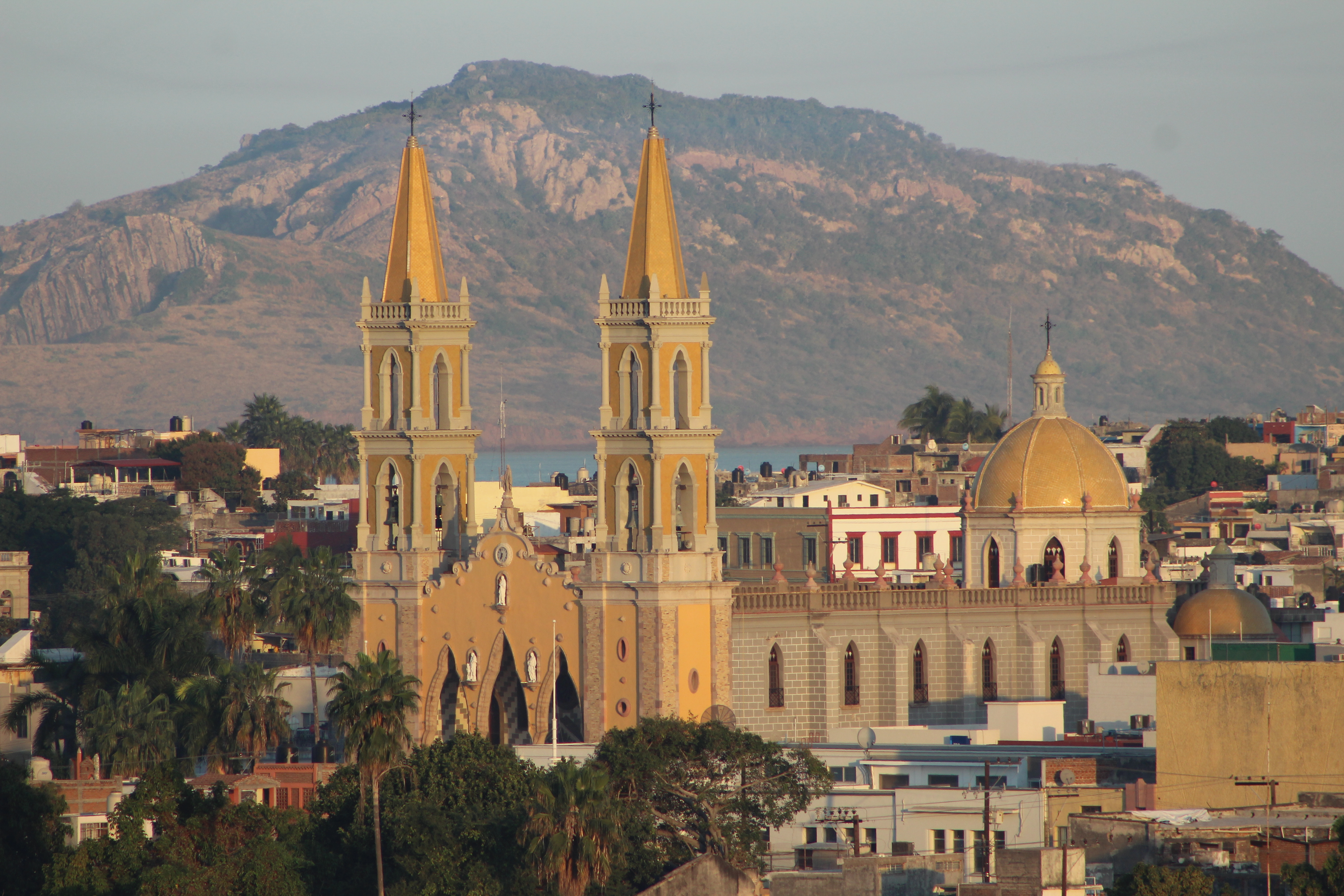
The Basilica Cathedral of Mazatlán

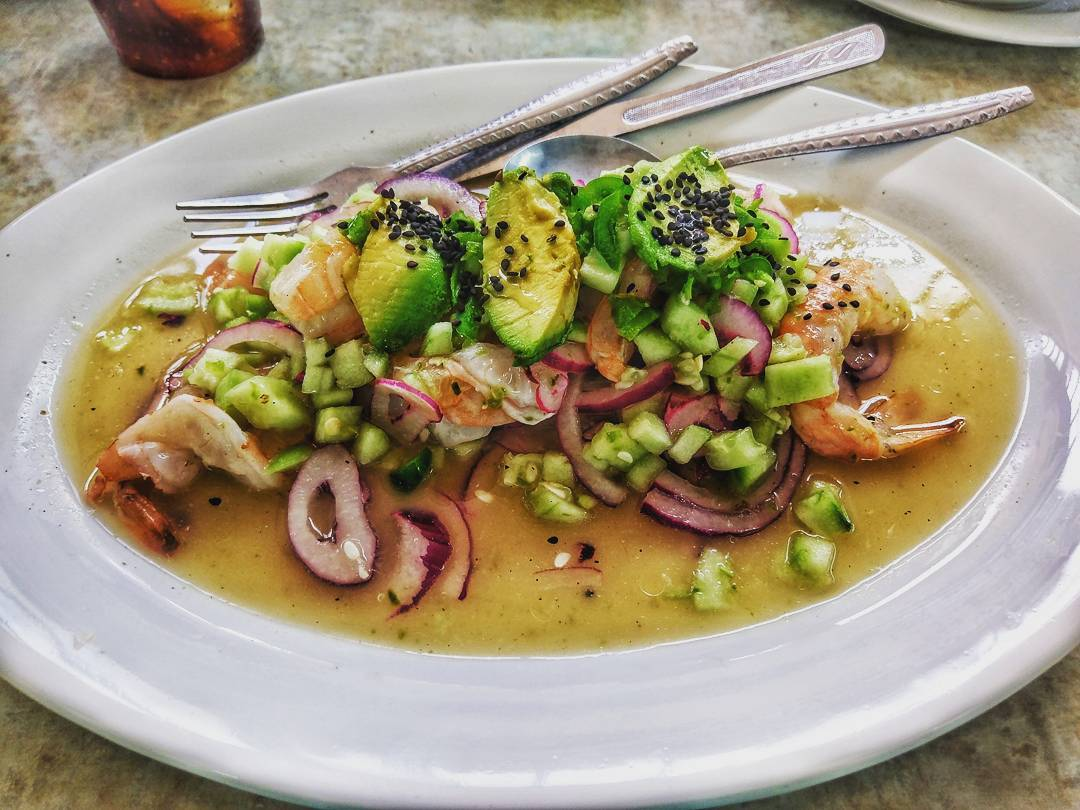
Aguachile is a Sinaloan dish made with fish fillet and shrimp marinated in lime juice and chiltepin

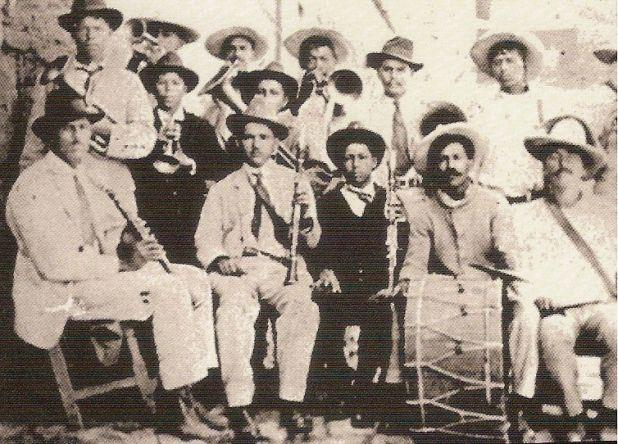
An early 20th century banda

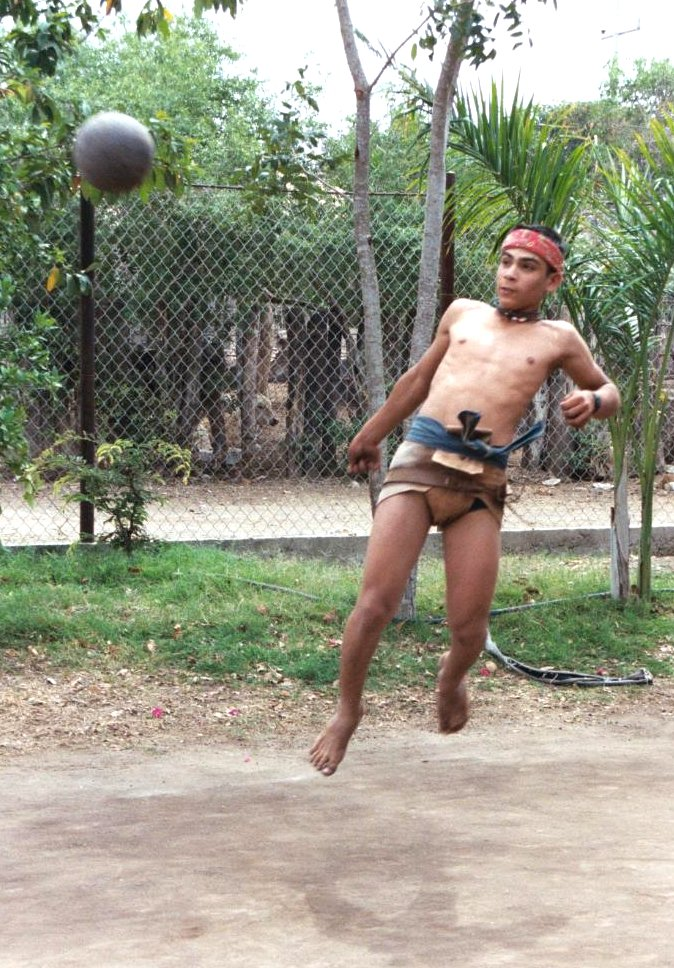
An ulama player in Sinaloa

Culturally, Sinaloa is part of Northern Mexico. Famous entertainers from the state include actor Pedro Infante, born in Mazatlán; singer Ana Gabriel, born in Guamúchil; singer and actress Lola Beltrán from Rosario; Cruz Lizárraga, the founder of Banda el Recodo; baseball player Jorge Orta, from Mazatlán; actress/comedian/singer Sheyla Tadeo, born in Culiacán; actress Sabine Moussier; actress/singer Lorena Herrera, from Mazatlán; and singer-songwriter Chalino Sánchez, from Las Flechas, Culiacán.

=== Arts ===
Sinaloa’s colonial architecture is present in Pueblos Mágicos such as El Fuerte, Mocorito, and Cosalá. Neoclassical influences are visible in landmarks such as the Ángela Peralta Theater and Baroque revival in the Basilica Cathedral of Mazatlán. The state government jointly awards the José Limón National Contemporary Dance Award, Mexico's most prestigious dance award. Notable writers from Sinaloa include Gilberto Owen, known for his modernist poetry, and Inés Arredondo, acclaimed for her psychological and realist short stories.

=== Cuisine ===
Its rich cuisine is well known for its variety, particularly regarding mariscos (seafood) and vegetables. Famous dishes include Chilorio and Aguachile. Sinaloan sushi is a popular dish.

=== Media ===
Newspapers of Sinaloa include: El Debate de Culiacán, El Debate de Guamúchil, El Debate de Guasave, El Debate de los Mochis, El Debate de Mazatlán, El Sol de Culiacán, El Sol de Sinaloa, La I Noticias para Mí Culiacán, Noroeste (Culiacán), Noroeste de Mazatlán, and Primera Hora.

=== Music ===
The state is known for its popular styles of music banda and norteño. Banda music, one of Mexico’s most distinctive regional genres, was popularized in Sinaloa in the late 19th century through the blending of traditional Mexican and indigenous styles including sones, ranchera, corrido, with European polka, waltz, fanfare, mazurka, schottische, and brass band ensembles. Initially performed by local wind ensembles, it evolved into one of the country's most popular genres. It is typically played with trumpets, clarinets, trombones, tubas, and tamboras.

Early bandas were formed by members of military and municipal bands who settled in the Sierra Madre Occidental during the Mexican Revolution, and were influenced by traditional Yoreme music. Perhaps the most popular song of the genre is "El Sinaloense", written by Severiano Briseño in 1944 and recorded by hundreds of bandas, in both lyrical and instrumental versions. The song is considered the state's unofficial anthem.

=== Organized crime ===
The powerful Sinaloa Cartel (Cártel de Sinaloa or CDS) has significantly influenced the culture of Sinaloa. The cartel is reportedly the largest drug trafficking, money laundering and organized crime syndicate in the Americas; it is based in the city of Culiacán, Sinaloa.

=== Sports ===
Sinaloa is one of the few places where the ancient Mesoamerican ballgame is still played, in a handful of small, rural communities near Mazatlán. The ritual ballgame was central in the society, religion and cosmology of all the great Mesoamerican cultures including the Mixtecs, Aztecs, and Maya. The Sinaloa version of the game is called ulama and is very similar to the original. There are efforts to preserve this 3500-year-old unique tradition by supporting the communities and children who play it.

The state is home to several baseball teams such as Tomateros de Culiacán, Venados de Mazatlán, Cañeros de Los Mochis and Algodoneros de Guasave which take part in the Mexican Pacific League. Football is represented at the professional level by Dorados de Sinaloa, based in Culiacán and playing at Estadio Dorados, and Mazatlán F.C., based in Mazatlán with home games at Estadio El Encanto; several smaller clubs and amateur teams also compete throughout the state. Sinaloa hosts professional basketball teams, including Caballeros de Culiacán, Frayles de Guasave, and Pioneros de Los Mochis, which compete in the Circuito de Baloncesto de la Costa del Pacífico.

== Notable people ==
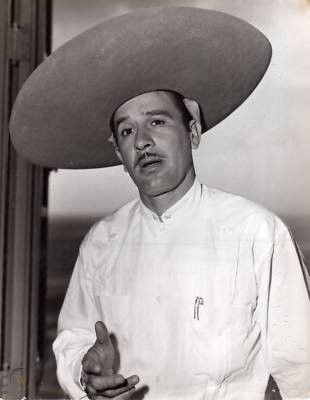
Pedro Infante, one of the most celebrated actors and singers of the Golden Age of Mexican cinema.

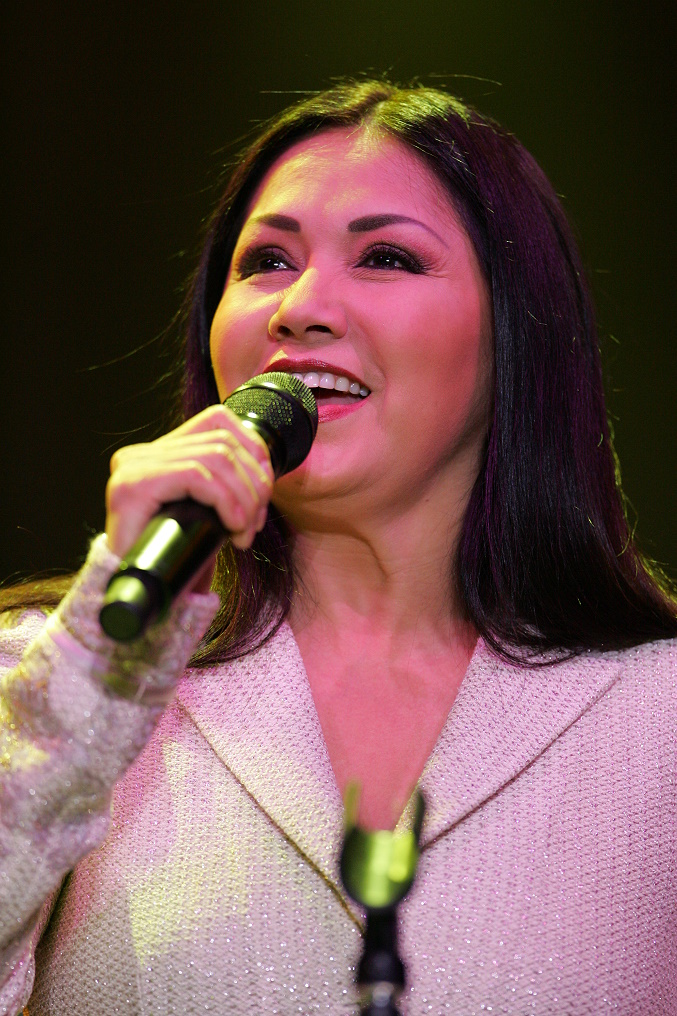
Ana Gabriel is the best-selling woman singer in Mexico.

- Chalino Sánchez – Singer
- Carlos Bojórquez – Boxer
- Julio César Chávez – Six time World Boxing Champion
- Jorge Orta – Major League Baseball player
- Jorge Arce – Boxer and flyweight champion
- Cristobal Arreola – Boxer
- Luis Ayala – Major League Baseball player
- Sandra Avila Beltrán – Drug Lord
- Lola Beltrán – Actress and Ranchera singer
- Perla Beltrán Acosta – Beauty queen, model, and entrepreneur
- Paul Aguilar — Football Player
- Heraclio Bernal – Social Agitator/Folk Hero
- Jared Borgetti – Football player
- Omar Bravo – Football player
- Ariel Camacho – Norteño Singer/Folk Songs
- Javier Valdez Cárdenas – Journalist
- Oscar Dautt – Football player
- Iván Estrada – Football player
- Carlos Fierro – Football player
- Rodolfo Fierro - Revolutionary Fighter
- Ana Gabriel – Singer
- Pedro Avilés Pérez – Drug Lord
- Joaquín Guzmán Loera – Former leader and co-founder of the Sinaloa Cartel.
- Miguel Ángel Félix Gallardo – Former leader and co-founder of the Guadalajara Cartel.
- Rafael Caro Quintero – Former leader and founder of the Sonora Cartel.
- Amado Carrillo Fuentes – Former leader and co-founder of the Juárez Cartel.
- Alfredo Beltrán Leyva – Leader and co-founder of the Beltrán-Leyva Organization.
- Héctor Luis Palma Salazar – Former leader and co-founder of the Sinaloa Cartel.
- Ismael Zambada García – Leader of the Sinaloa Cartel.
- Benjamín Arellano Félix – Former leader and co-founder of the Tijuana Cartel (Arellano Félix Organization).
- Ramón Arellano Félix – Former leader and co-founder of the Tijuana Cartel (Arellano Félix Organization).
- Ernesto Fonseca Carrillo – Former leader and co-founder of the Guadalajara Cartel.
- Enedina Arellano Félix – Leader and co-founder of the Tijuana Cartel (Arellano Félix Organization).
- Lorena Herrera – Actress
- Pedro Infante – Singer and actor
- Francisco Labastida – Economist and politician affiliated to the PRI
- Horacio Llamas – Basketball player
- Los Tigres del Norte – Norteño music group
- Banda el Recodo – Banda Sinaloense
- Jesús Malverde – Folklore hero
- Alberto Medina – Football player
- César Millán – TV personality and professional dog trainer
- Fernando Montiel – Boxer
- Héctor Moreno – Football player
- Sabine Moussier – Actress
- Patricia Navidad – Actress and singer
- Antonio Osuna – Major League Baseball player
- Roberto Osuna – Major League Baseball player
- Óliver Pérez – Major League Baseball player
- Fausto Pinto – Football player
- Julio Preciado – Singer
- José Luis Ramírez – Boxer
- Sara Ramírez – Actress
- Paul Rodriguez – Comedian
- Aurelio Rodríguez – Major League Baseball player
- Dennys Reyes – Major League Baseball player
- Sheyla Tadeo – Actress and comedian
- María del Rosario Espinoza – Taekwondo Olympic medalist
- Roberto Tapia – Singer
- Julio Urías – Major League Baseball player
- José Urquidy – Major League Baseball player
- Chayito Valdez – Folk singer
- Banda MS - Banda Sinaloense
- La Arrolladora Banda El Limon - Banda Sinaloense
- Banda Los Recoditos - Banda Sinaloense
- José Manuel López Castro - Norteño Singer
- Ozziel Herrera - Football player
- Los Cuates de Sinaloa - Sierreño band

== See also ==
- Sinaloa Cartel
- Las Labradas, an archaeological site located in southern Sinaloa

== Further information ==
- C. Michael Hogan. 2009. Elephant Tree: Bursera microphylla, GlobalTwitcher.com, ed. N. Stromberg
- Asociación de Gestores del Patrimonio Histórico y Cultural de Mazatlán. 2009. The Mesoamerican Ballgame-Ulama
