= Escuinapa de Hidalgo =

City in the Mexican state of Sinaloa

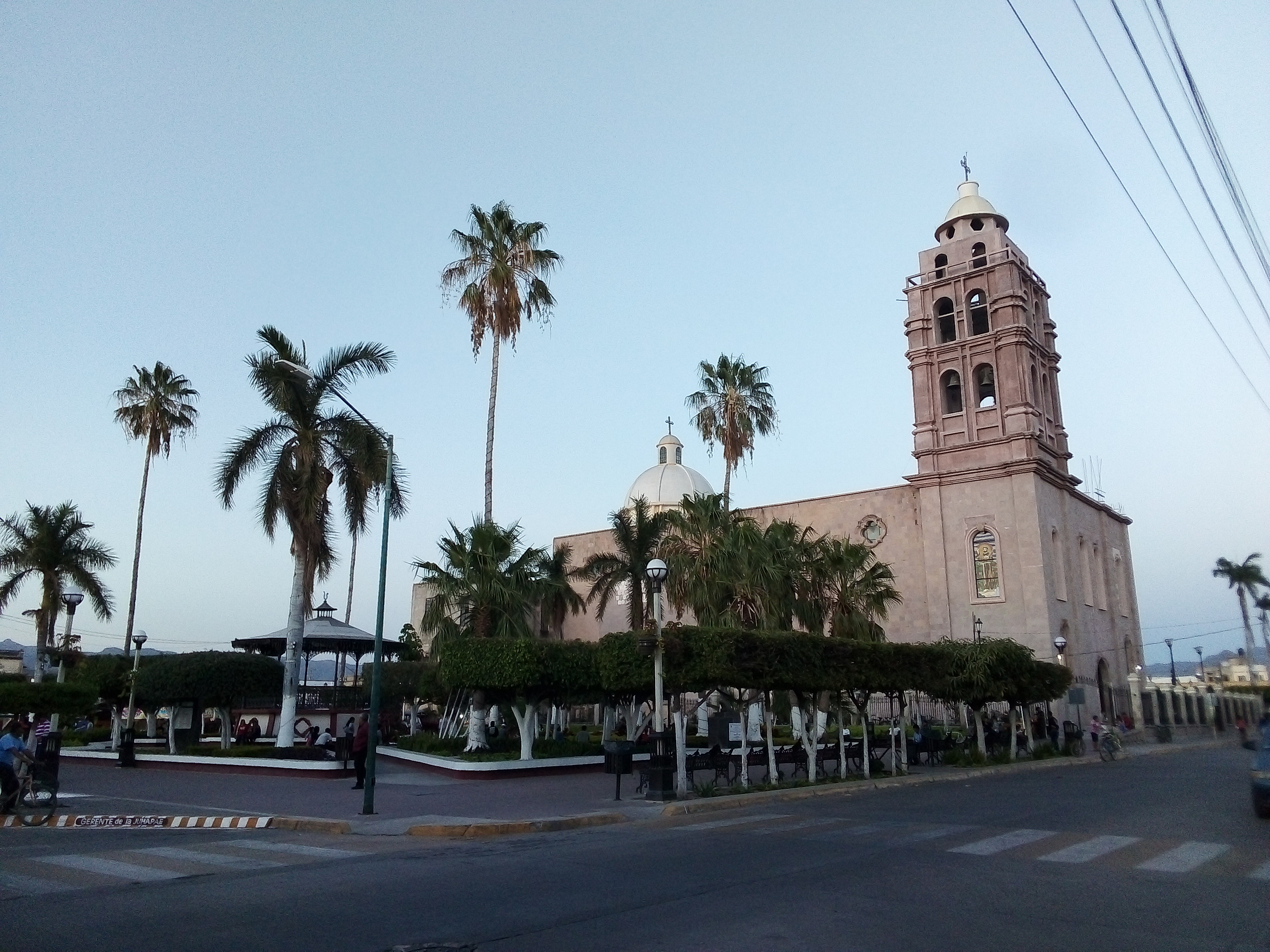
- Templo de San Francisco de Asís

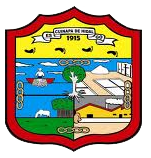
- Seal

- Location in Mexico
- Coordinates: 22°50′06″N 105°46′41″W
- Country: Mexico
- State: Sinaloa
- Municipality: Escuinapa

Government
  - Mayor: Blanca Estela Garcia
- Elevation: 10 m (33 ft)

Population (2010)
  - Total: 30,790
- Time zone: UTC-7 (Mountain Standard Time)
- Postal code: 82400
- Website: Escuinapa Government page

Escuinapa de Hidalgo is a city in Escuinapa Municipality of the same name, located at the extreme southern end of the Mexican state of Sinaloa. At the census of 2005 the city had a population of 28,789 inhabitants (the sixth-largest community in the state), while the municipality reported 49,655 inhabitants. The municipality has an area of 1633.22 km² (630.58 sq mi) and includes the towns of Isla del Bosque and Teacapan, in addition to many smaller localities.

== Sister City ==
- Montebello, California
