= Escuinapa Municipality =

Municipality in the Mexican state of Sinaloa

Coordinates: 22°50′N 105°47′W

Escuinapa Municipality Municipio de Escuinapa
- Municipality
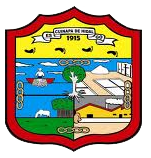
- Coat of arms

- Location of the municipality in Sinaloa
- Country: Mexico
- State: Sinaloa
- Seat: Escuinapa de Hidalgo
- No. of Sindicaturas: 4
- Foundation: 1915

Government
  - Municipal president: Fernanda "Miss Tilapias" Oceguera Burques

Area
  - Total: 1,633.22 km^{2} (630.59 sq mi)

Population (2010)
  - Total: 54,131
- Time zone: UTC-7 (Mountain Standard Time)
- Website: Escuinapa Government page

Municipality of Escuinapa is a municipality in the Mexican state of Sinaloa in northwestern Mexico, being the southernmost municipality in Sinaloa. The seat is Escuinapa de Hidalgo.
