= El Rosario, Sinaloa =

City in the Mexican state of Sinaloa

El Rosario
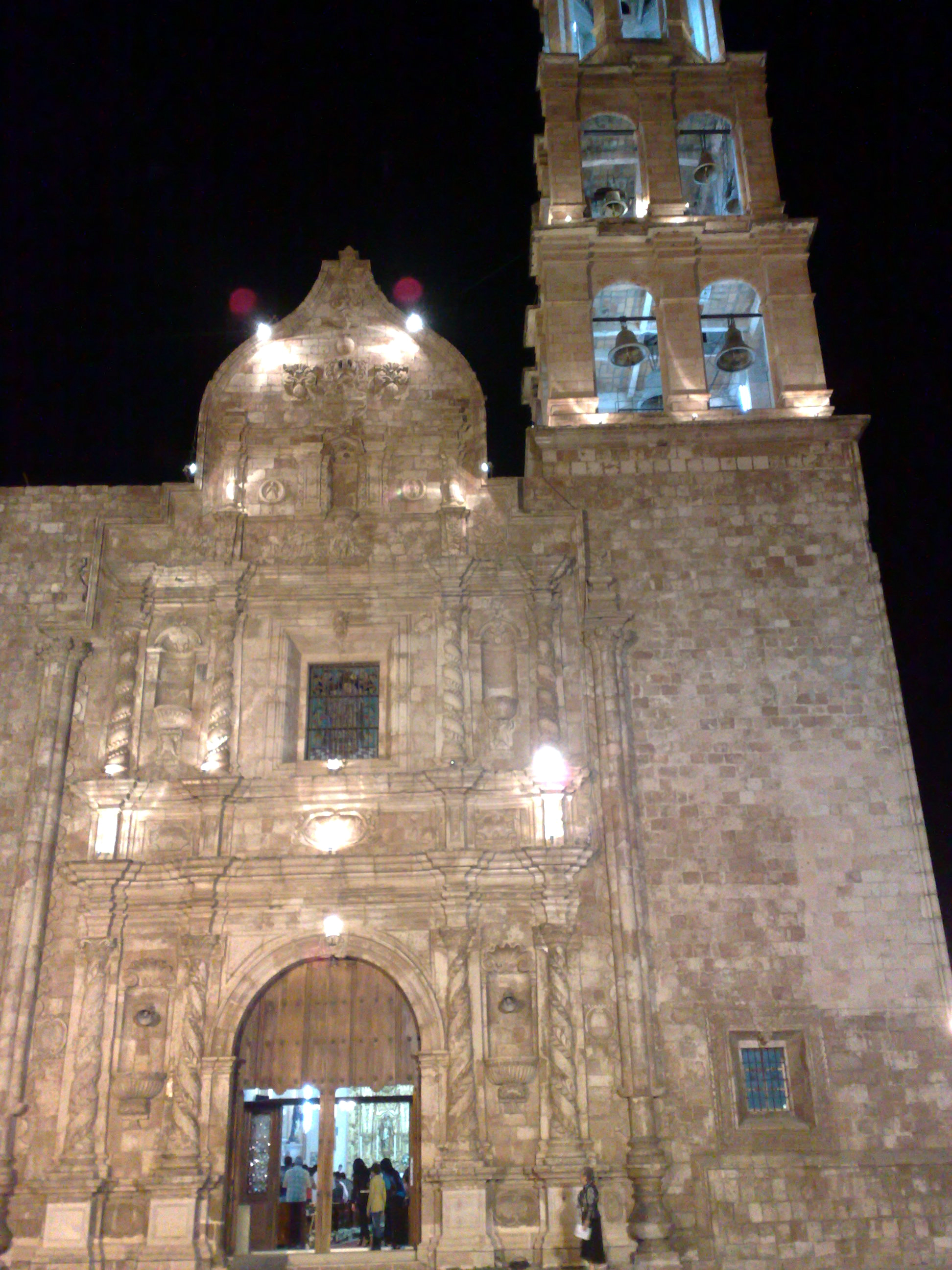
- Church of Our Lady of the Rosary

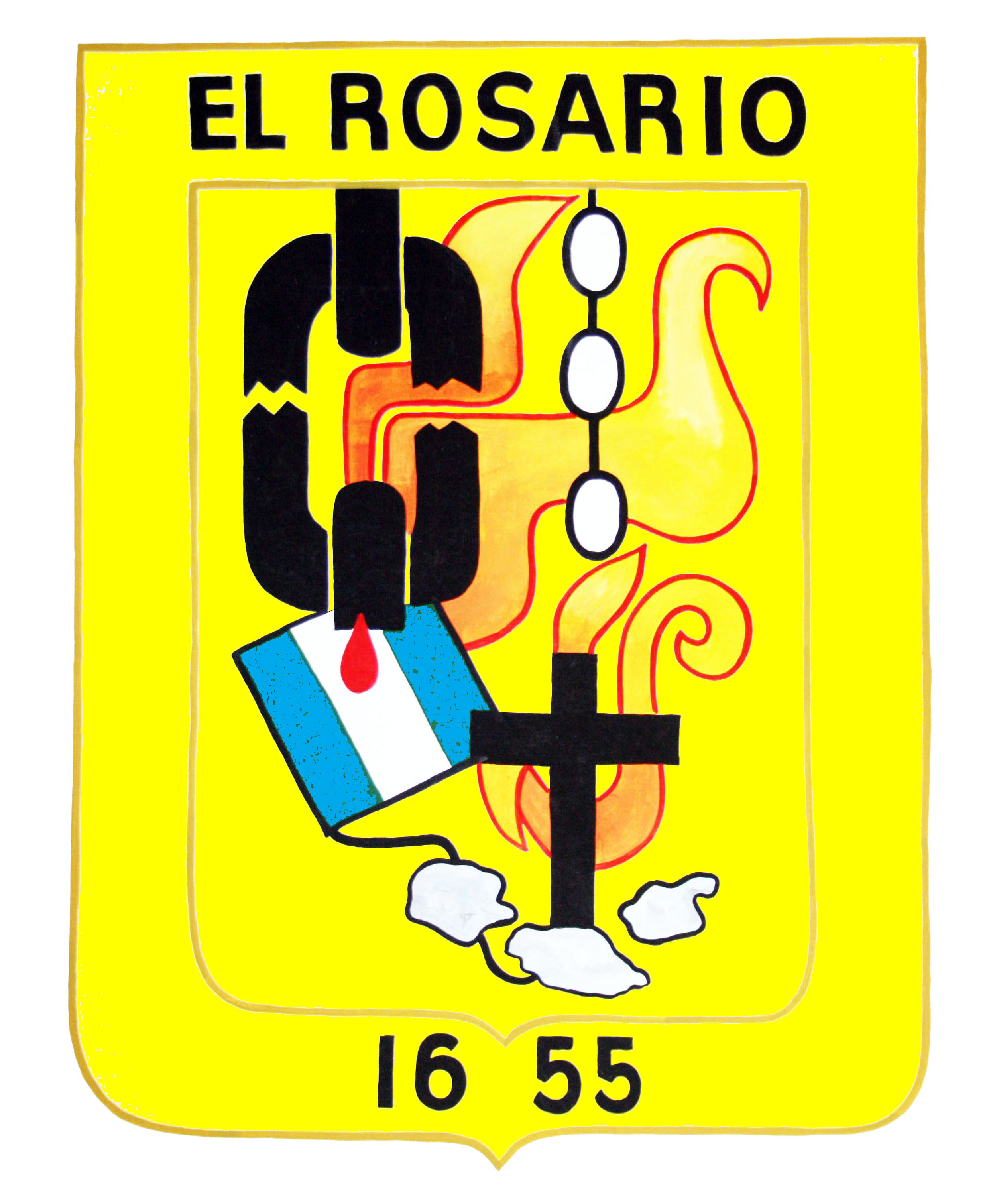
- Seal

- Location in Mexico
- Coordinates: 22°59′32″N 105°51′26″W
- Country: Mexico
- State: Sinaloa
- Municipality: Rosario
- Founded in: 1655

Government
  - Municipal president: Ángel Alfonso Silva Santiago

Population (2010)
  - Total: 16,002
- Time zone: UTC-7 (Mountain Standard Time)
- Website: Official website

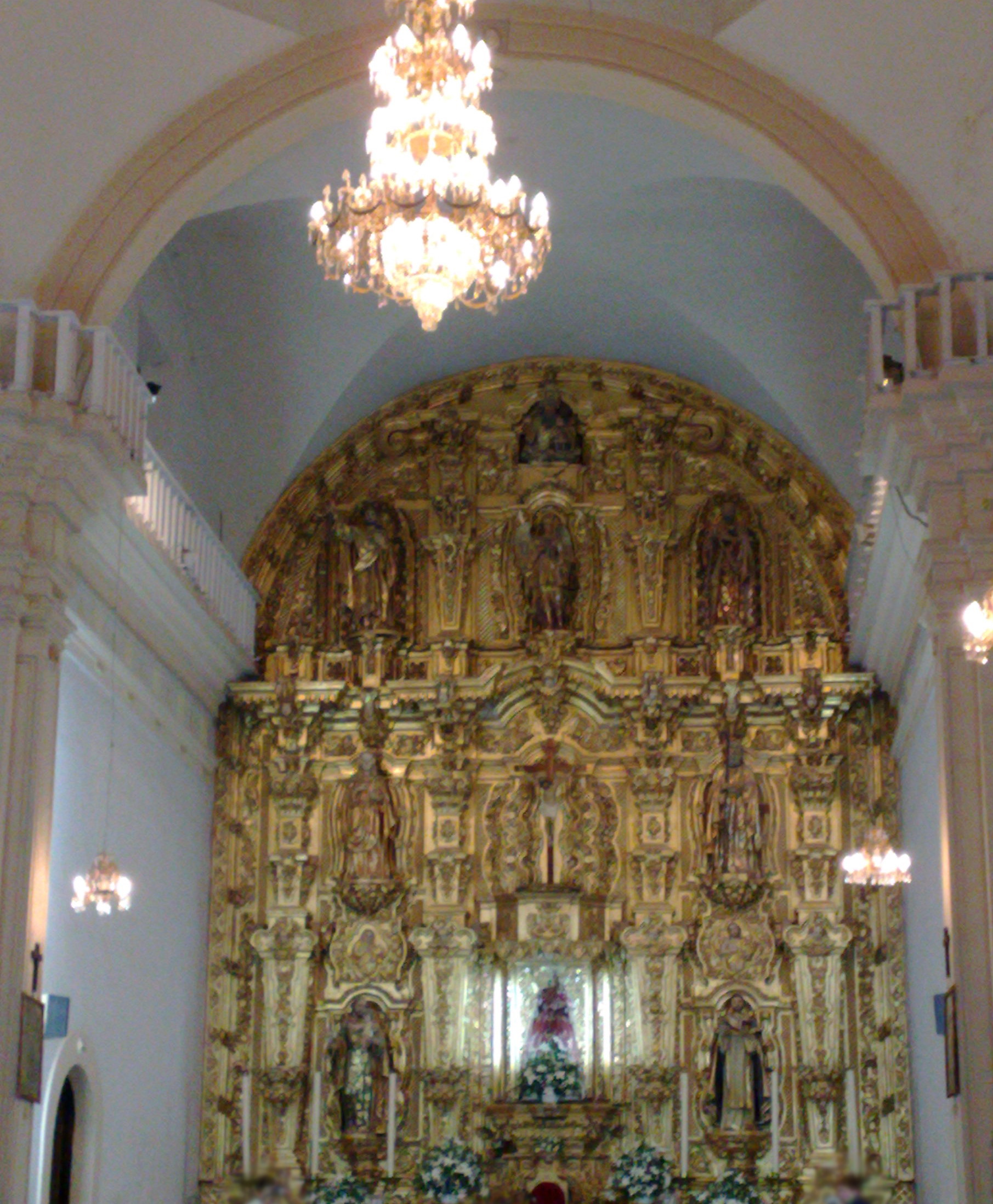
Church of Our Lady of the Rosary

El Rosario (Spanish pronunciation: [el roˈsaɾjo]) is a city and its surrounding municipality in the Mexican state of Sinaloa. It stands at 22°45′00″N 105°22′16″W.

The city reported 16,001 inhabitants in the 2010 census.

== Overview ==
El Rosario, a small town about 31 miles (50 km) south of Mazatlán, is famous for the altar in the town church. The altar alone makes a visit to El Rosario somewhat worth the drive. El Rosario was once the richest town in Northwest Mexico because of the local mining operations. This small town was the home of the famous Mexican singer, Lola Beltrán. They have built a small museum in her honor although the museum is open only sporadically. The local economy produces pottery, furniture, and leather goods.

The city was founded on August 3, 1655. It is said that on that day a corporal named Bonifacio was looking for missing cattle. He walked along a river in what is now known as Loma de Santiago, from where the cattle was lost. He went for it and captured it. As it had turned to night he lit a fire. When he woke up he was in for a major surprise, under the ashes of the fire he saw large molten silver adhered to a rock. He then gave the news to his boss. But before he left to give the news he left rosary beads to mark the place. His boss ran to the location to confirm that it was silver and began to extract the silver.

== Cultural references ==
Rosario Sinaloa is the town referred to as Tres Camarones in the writing of Luis Alberto Urrea. The area now is known for growing amapola and marijuana in the hillsides, considered now the new gold mines for the area.
