= Navolato Municipality =

Municipality in the Mexican state of Sinaloa

Coordinates: 24°45′55″N 107°42′06″W

Municipality of Navolato
- Municipality
- Coat of arms

- Location of the municipality in Sinaloa
- Country: Mexico
- State: Sinaloa
- Time zone: UTC-7 (MST)

Navolato is a municipality in the Mexican state of Sinaloa in northwestern Mexico.
