= Autonomous University of Sinaloa =

Mexican public university

- Universidad Autónoma de Sinaloa
- Motto: Sursum Versus
- Motto in English: Upwards
- Type: Public
- Established: 5 May 1873
- Rector: Jesús Madueña Molina
- Students: 160,000 (2022)
- Location: 4 main campuses with the central campus in Culiacán, Sinaloa, Mexico
- Colors: Blue, gold and mustard
- Mascot: Eagle
- Website: uas.edu.mx

The Autonomous University of Sinaloa (Universidad Autónoma de Sinaloa or UAS) is a public university with its central campus located in the state capital of Culiacán, Sinaloa and with campuses in multiple locations within the state. The university is ranked in the top 25 universities of Mexico.

UAS was founded on 5 May 1873 in Mazatlán and at the time called Liceo Rosales. The school transferred to Culiacán in 1874 due to political reasons and its name changed to Colegio Rosales. Towards the end of the Mexican Revolution, in 1918 it received "autonomy status" and re-named as the Universidad de Occidente. In 1965, it was re-named to its present name.

The university serves some 160,000 students on its own at high school, undergraduate and postgraduate level. UAS is divided into 4 Regional Units within the state of Sinaloa and has 4 main campuses in Culiacán, Guamúchil, Los Mochis and Mazatlán as well as several satellite campuses throughout the state.

== History ==
Liceo Rosales (named after the former Governor of Sinaloa Antonio Rosales) was founded on 5 May 1873 in Mazatlán and was designed to teach professional careers such as engineering, law, accounting, chemistry and teaching degrees. A year later, in 1874 the school was transferred to the newly appointed state capital of Culiacán and re-named Colegio Rosales. Towards the end of the Mexican Revolution in 1918, the Governor of the state of Sinaloa, Ramón F. Iturbe, was in favor of granting the university more autonomy to administer and decide its own academic programs and the school was re-named to Universidad de Occidente, however, in 1922 the schools was changed to Colegio Civil Rosales.

In 1937, under the influence of then Mexican President Lázaro Cárdenas, the school was re-named Universidad Socialista del Noroeste (Socialist University of the Northwest) as a promoter and supporter of the social reforms taking place in that time period. In 1941, the school was re-named the University of Sinaloa and in 1965, the university re-gained and developed its autonomy status. Since then, the school's name was changed to its current name of Autonomous University of Sinaloa (Universidad Autónoma de Sinaloa).

== University Regional Administrative Units ==
Regional Areas of the UAS Northern Regional Unit Central-Northern Regional Unit Central Regional Unit Southern Regional Unit

The UAS is divided in 4 Regional Units:

- Northern Unit: the main campus for this region is based in Los Mochis. The municipalities that pertains to this regional unit are the following:
  - Ahome
  - El Fuerte
  - Choix
  - Guasave (split between Northern and Central-Northern Regional Unit)
- Central-Northern Unit: the main campus for this region is based in Guamúchil. The municipalities that pertains to this regional unit are the following:
  - Angostura
  - Guasave (split between Northern and Central-Northern Regional Unit)
  - Mocorito
  - Salvador Alvarado
  - Sinaloa (municipality)
- Central Regional Unit: the main campus for this region is based in Culiacán. The municipalities that pertains to this regional unit are the following:
  - Badiraguato
  - Cosalá
  - Culiacán
  - Elota
  - Navolato
- Southern Regional Unit: the main campus for this region is based in Mazatlán. The municipalities that pertains to this regional unit are the following:
  - Concordia
  - Escuinapa
  - Mazatlán
  - Rosario
  - San Ignacio

== Gallery ==
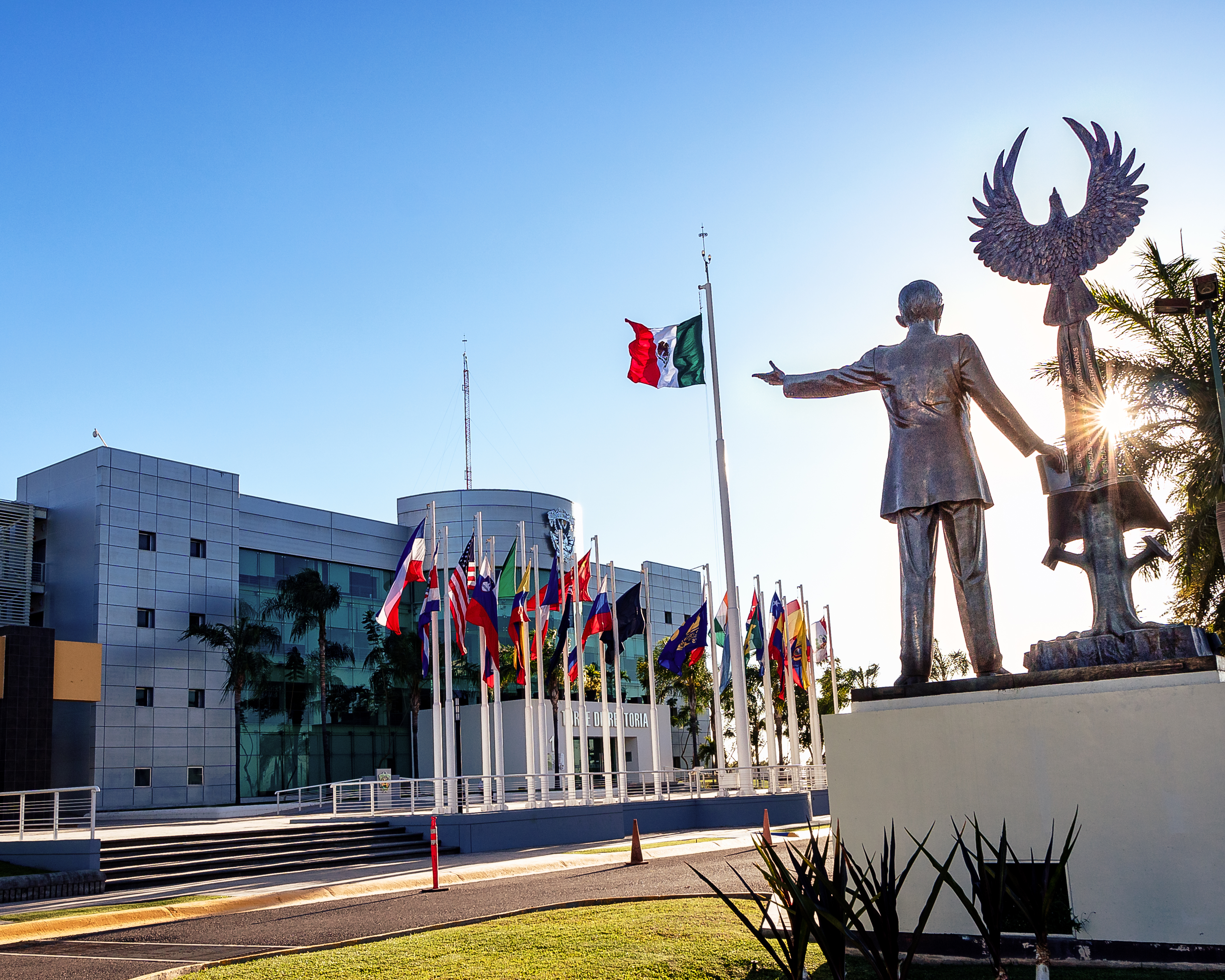
Torre de Rectoría, Culiacán Campus

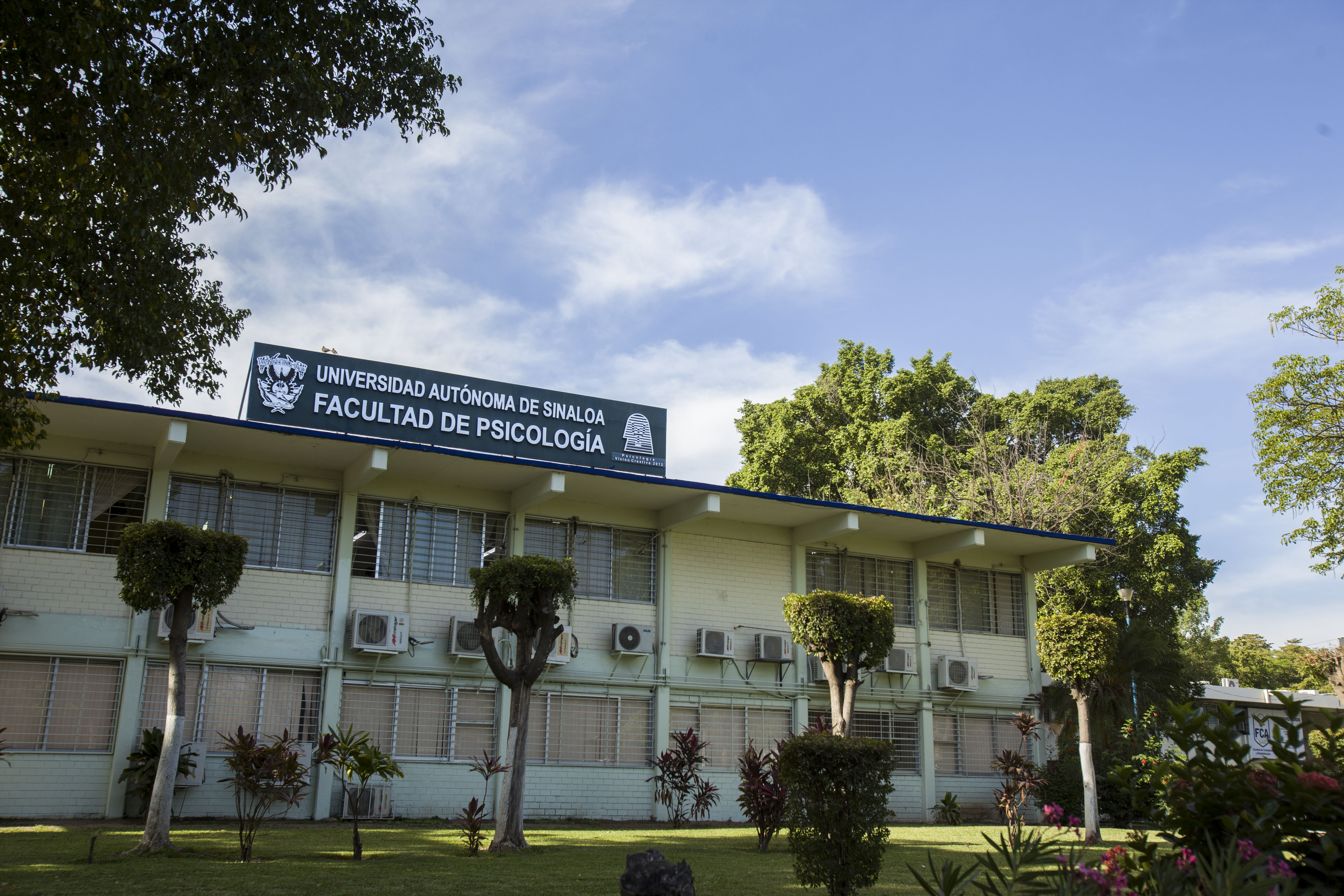
Faculty of Psychology, Culiacán Campus

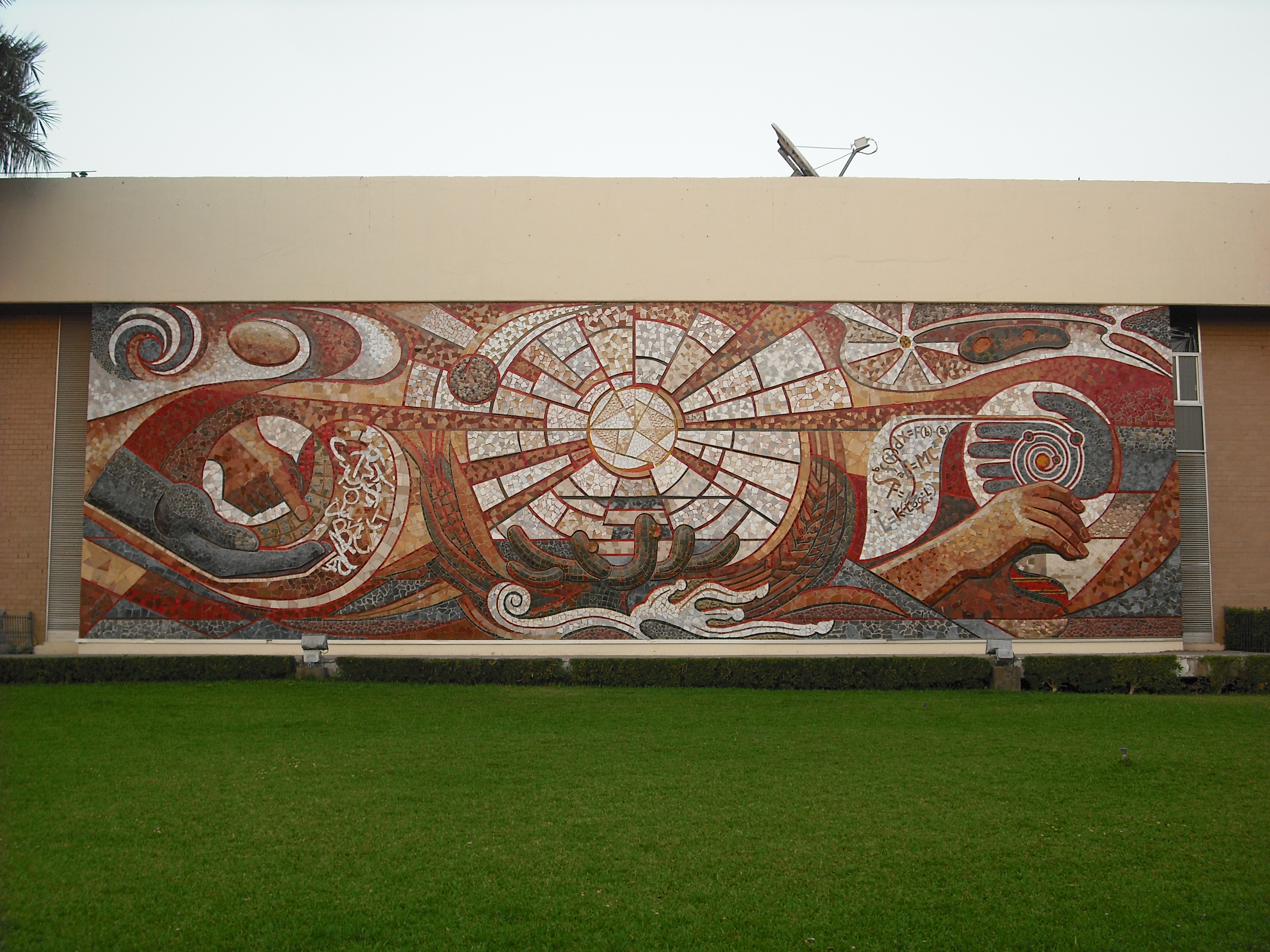
Culiacán Campus Central Library Mural

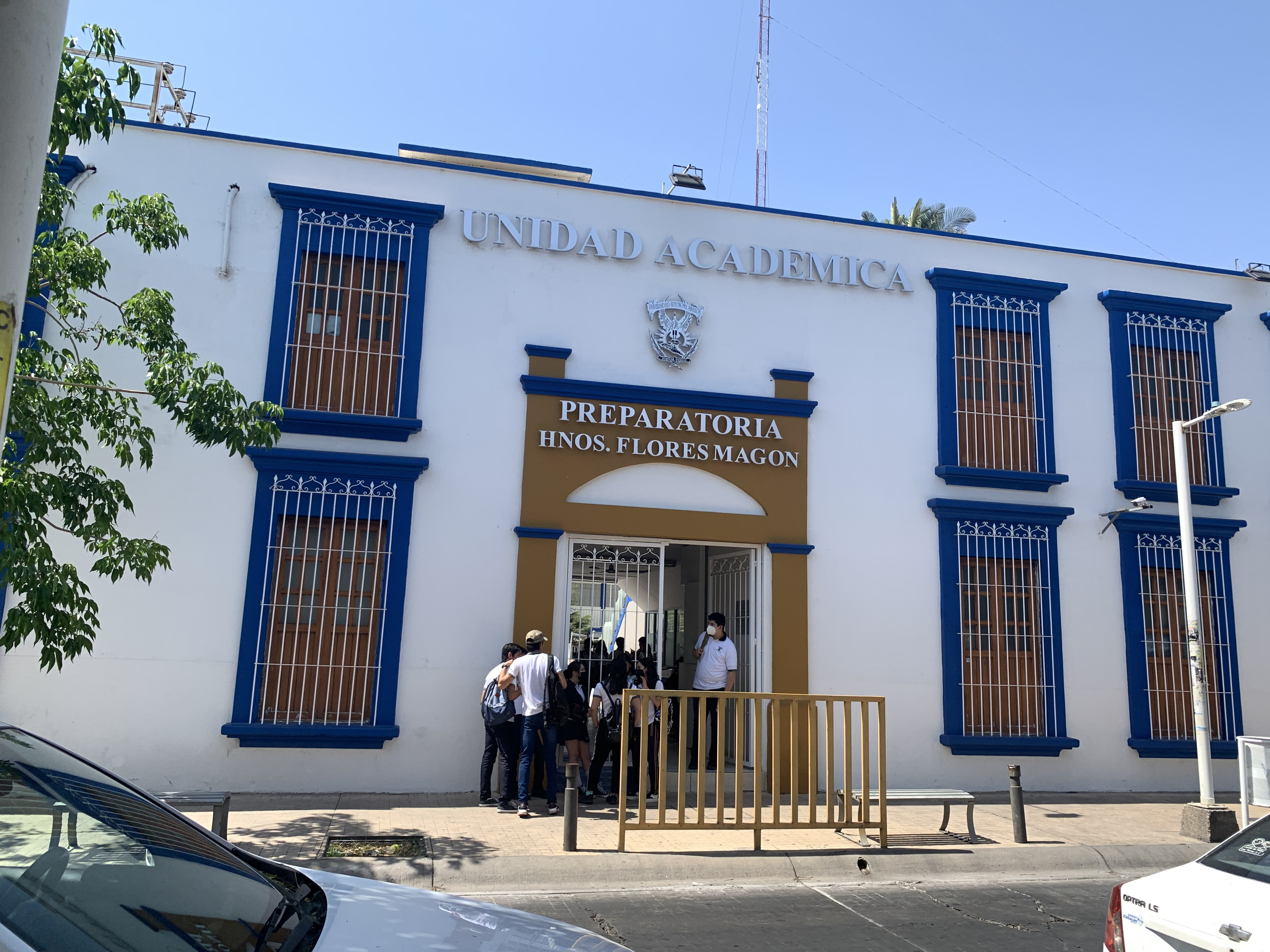
UAS High School, Culiacán
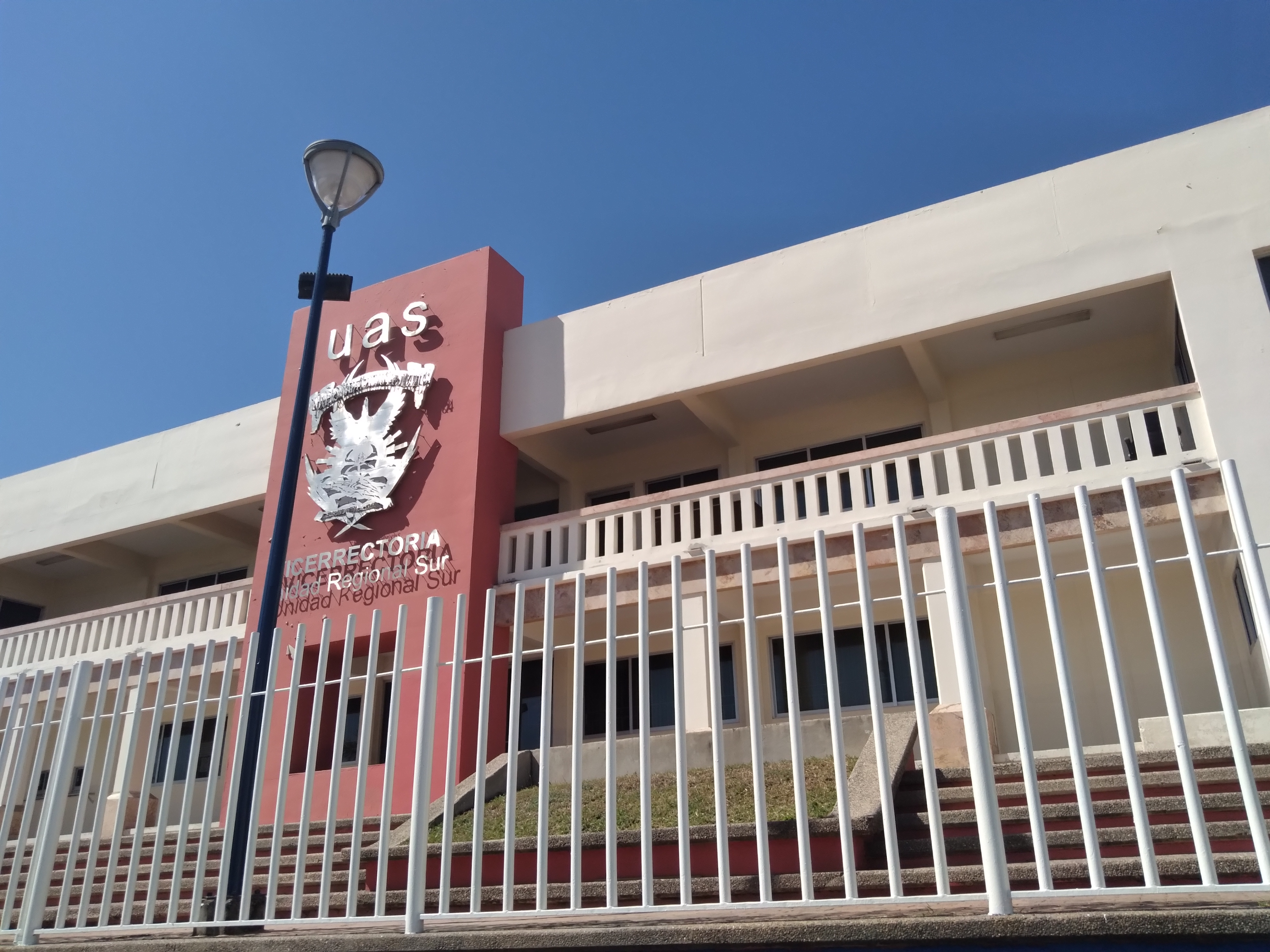
Main building, Mazatlán Campus

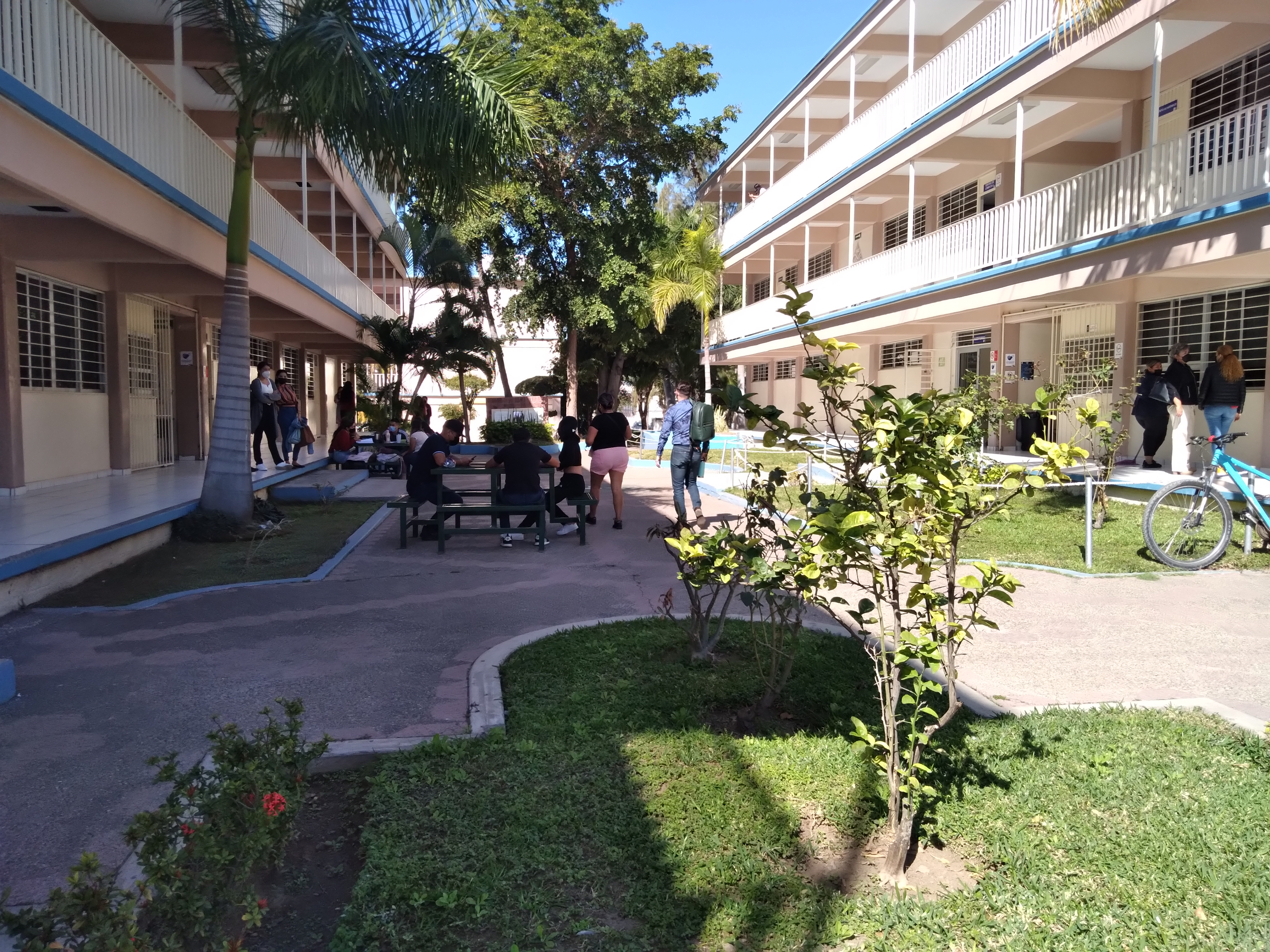
Classroom building, Mazatlán Campus

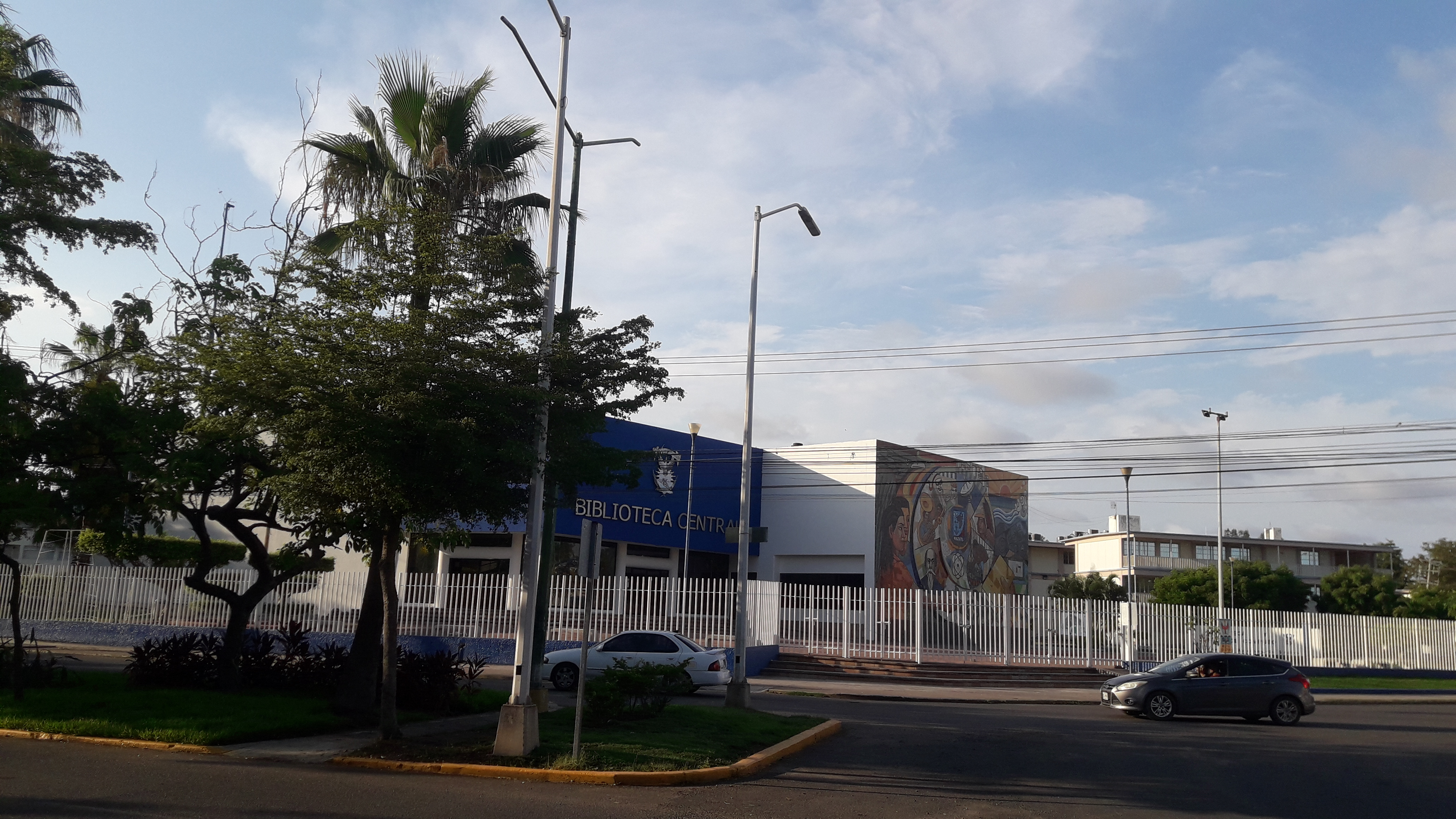
Mazatlán Campus Main Library with Mural

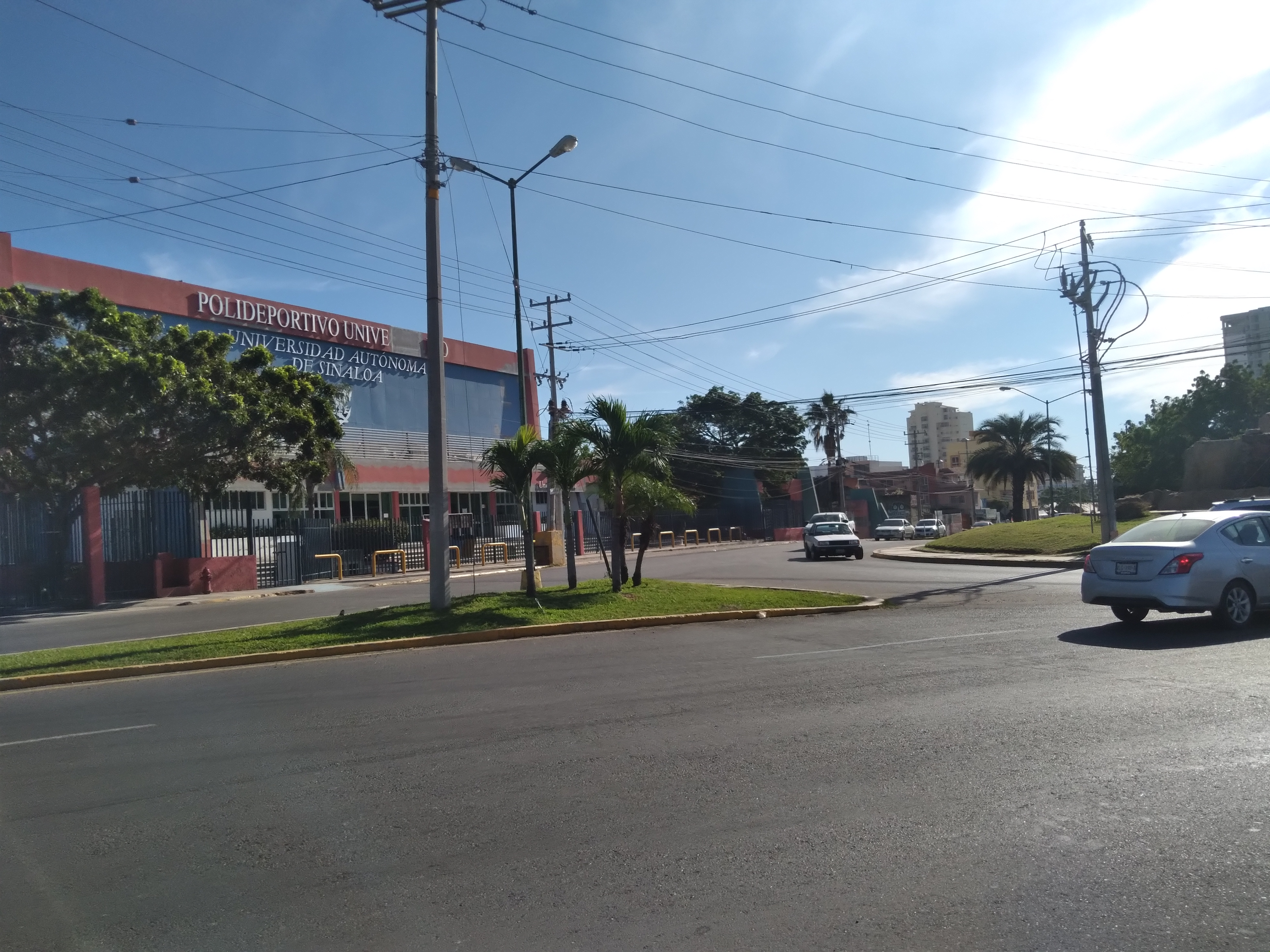
Sports Center, Mazatlán Campus

== Academic organization ==
The UAS is divided into several faculties and schools that support and coordinate most of the university's academic and administrative activity throughout its campuses. Each faculty is divided into departments that coordinate the teaching and research of the different subjects.

=== Faculties ===
- Faculty of Accounting and Administration
- Faculty of Agriculture and Rural Development
- Faculty of Agronomy
- Faculty of Architecture
- Faculty of Biology
- Faculty of Chemical Biological Sciences
- Faculty of Computer Science
- Faculty of Dentistry
- Faculty of Earth and Space Sciences
- Faculty of Economics
- Faculty of Education Sciences
- Faculty of Engineering
- Faculty of History
- Faculty of International Studies and Public Policy
- Faculty of Law and Political Science
- Faculty of Marine Sciences
- Faculty of Medicine
- Faculty of Nursing
- Faculty of Nutrition and Gastronomy
- Faculty of Philosophy and Letters
- Faculty of Physical Education and Sports
- Faculty of Physics and Mathematics Sciences
- Faculty of Psychology
- Faculty of Social Sciences
- Faculty of Social Work
- Faculty of Veterinary Medicine and Zootechnics

=== Schools ===
- School of Anthropological Sciences
- School of Art and Plastic
- School of Business
- School of Language Study
- School of Music
- School of Tourism

== Athletics ==
The Autonomous University of Sinaloa sponsors the following sports.

Sport	Men's	Women's
American football	Yes	
Archery	Yes	Yes
Baseball	Yes	
Beach volleybal	Yes	Yes
Boxing	Yes	Yes
Cycling	Yes	Yes
Flag football	Yes	Yes
Football	Yes	Yes
Handball	Yes	Yes
Judo	Yes	Yes
Rugby sevens	Yes	
Softball		Yes
Swimming	Yes	Yes
Table tennis	Yes	Yes
Taekwondo	Yes	Yes
Tennis	Yes	Yes
Track and field	Yes	Yes
Triathlon	Yes	Yes
Volleyball	Yes	Yes
Weightlifting	Yes	Yes
Wrestling	Yes	Yes

== Notable alumni ==
- Bernardo J. Gastélum, Mexican physician, politician, and writer
- Francisco Labastida Mexican economist and politician
- Genaro Estrada, Mexican statesman, academic, and writer
- Itzel Manjarrez, Mexican taekwondo practiotioner who competed at the 2016 Summer Olympics in the women's 49 kg
- Jesús Aguilar Padilla, Mexican politician and lawyer

== Media ==
UAS operates Radio UAS with stations in Culiacán (XEUAS 1150AM and XHUAS 96.1FM) and Los Mochis (XHMSA 102.9FM); and a local TV channel.

== See also ==
- Education in Mexico
- List of universities in Mexico
