= Juan José Ríos =

City in the Mexican state of Sinaloa

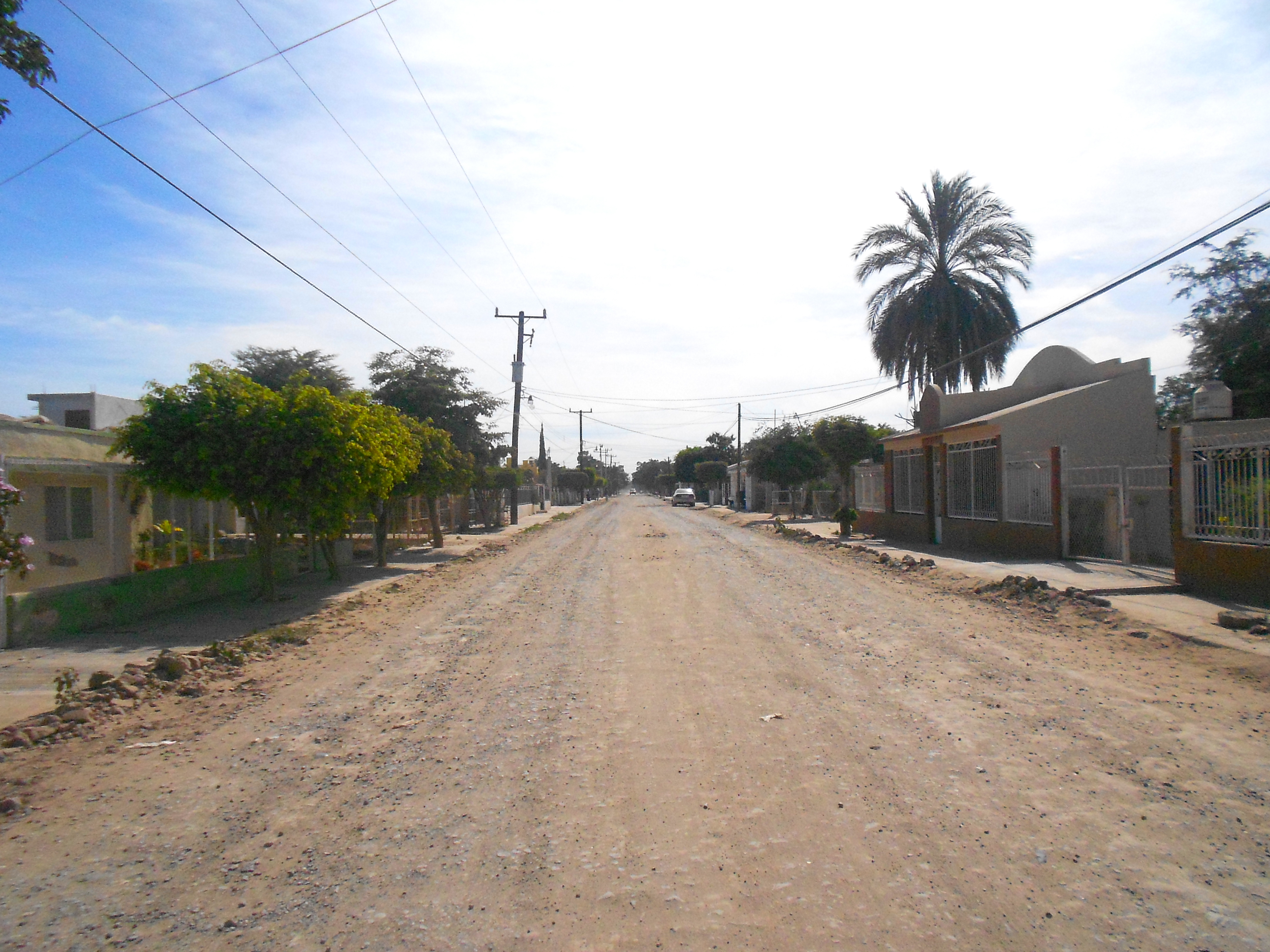
- Street in Juan José Ríos

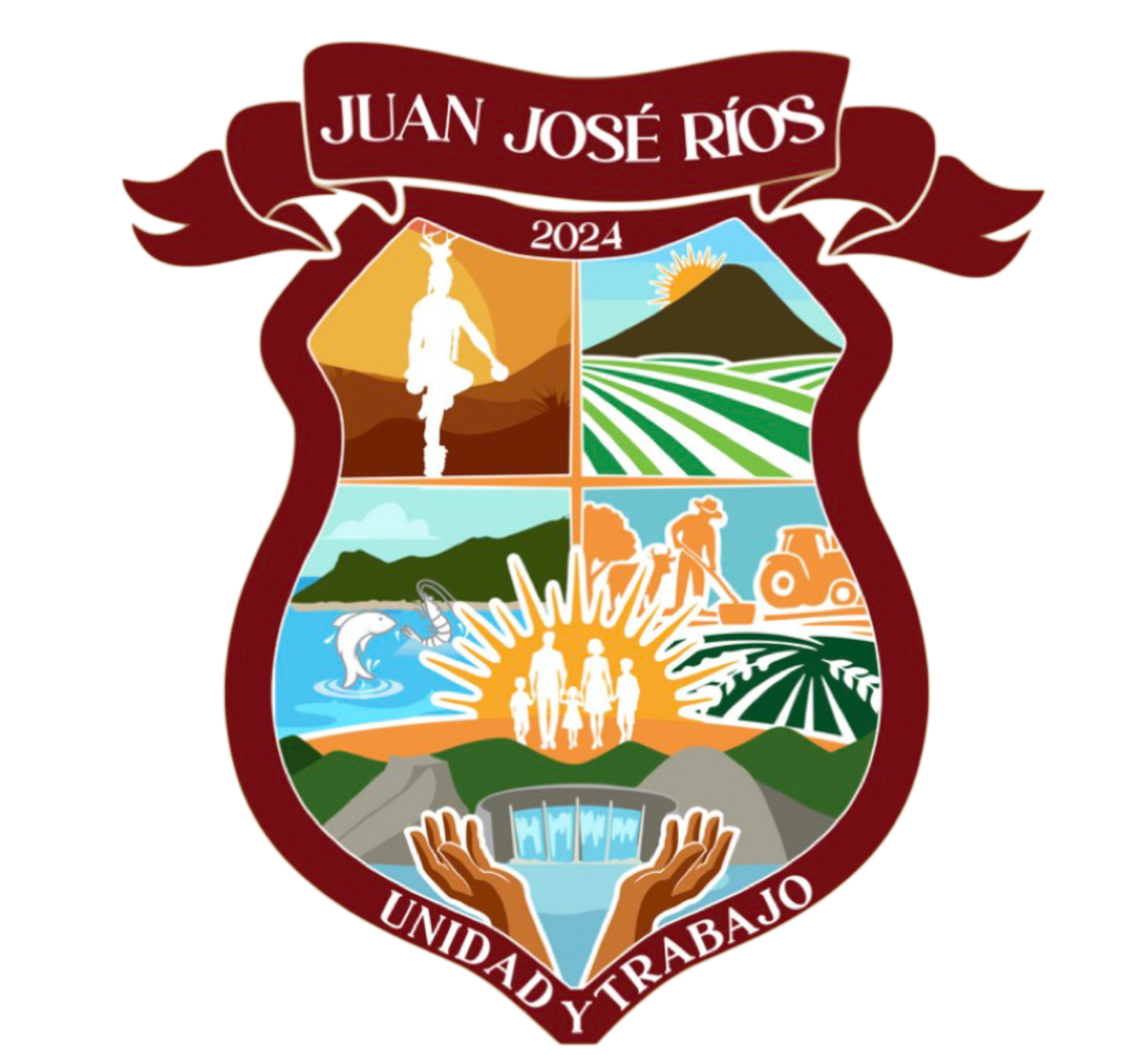
- Coat of arms
- Nicknames: Che Ríos and JJR
- Location in Mexico Juan José Ríos (Sinaloa)
- Coordinates: 25°45′26″N 108°49′18″W
- Country: Mexico
- State: Sinaloa
- Municipality: Guasave and Ahome
- Founded in: 21 September 1938 (as Ejido Las Vacas); 21 February 1955 (as Sindicatura of J.J. Ríos); 13 July 1989 (as City of J.J. Ríos)
- Founded by: Lázaro Cárdenas del Río

Government
  - Síndico: Luis Fernando Chinchillas Cota PAN
- Elevation: 12 m (39 ft)

Population (2020)
  - Locality: 22,421
  - Rank: 13th in Sinaloa
- Time zone: UTC-7 (Mountain Standard Time)
- Postal code: 81110
- Website: Government page

Juan José Ríos (Spanish pronunciation: [ˈxwaŋ xoˈse ˈri.os]) is an agricultural city located in Northern Sinaloa, Mexico. It is divided in two municipalities, where its major part is located in Guasave Municipality, and the rest is in Ahome Municipality. It had a population of 27,938 inhabitants (including city's both parts in Guasave and Ahome Municipalities), according to the 2010 census.

== History ==
Ejido Las Vacas was founded on 21 September 1938 by presidential decision, by the then President Lázaro Cárdenas del Río. It had an area of 16,420 ha (164.2 km^{2}) and 179 inhabitants; of which 64 were ejidatarios.

Between the years of 1946 and 1951 several peasants from Los Mochis, 18 de Marzo and San Miguel Zapotitlán towns, Ahome Municipality; and La Louisiana town, El Fuerte Municipality, requested to the Agricultural Department that they be granted with plots to sow in Ejido Las Vacas. And between the years of 1953 and 1954, Agricultural Department granted all of the 672 people who had requested plots.

Several towns in El Fuerte and Choix Municipalities were affected when Miguel Hidalgo Dam construction started. Its construction was divided in two phases: the first one was in the years of 1952 to 1956, and the second one in the years of 1956 to 1964.

The affected towns by dam construction in El Fuerte Municipality were: El Máhone, San Felipe, Gipago y Peñasco, Rincón de Sinaloíta and Los Mezcales. The affected towns in Choix Municipality were: El Pajarito, Baca, Caballihuasa, Toro, Picachos and El Sáuz. The towns which were affected, their inhabitants were located in different ejidos, as it was in Ejido Las Vacas and its nearby ejidos.

On 21 February 1955, by presidential decision, it was approved an urban area construction in Ejido Las Vacas, for all the affected people by the dam construction. On 28 February 1955, the 637 peasants who were evacuated from the 11 ejidos, which would be flooded by Fort River when the grout curtain of Miguel Hidalgo dam was closed. Affected people were given a 10 ha plot to sow and another plot for living in Ejido Las Vacas. Also, in Ejido Las Vacas were living the original 64 ejidatarios, they lived in Old Las Vacas, as they named the oldest part of Ejido Las Vacas. However, locating the 1375 ejidatarios with their families, it needed another presidential decision to locate in 500 ha each ejidatario giving them a 1,600 m^{2} (40 m x 40 m) plot for living, including as well as streets, schools and other public services, becoming an urban area, which one were named Juan José Ríos, and it became in a sindicatura. It was the Mexico's biggest ejido, it had an area of 16,420 ha (164.2 km^{2}).

Juan José Ríos is named after General Juan José Ríos, a politician and a soldier during the Mexican Revolution. Engineers who planned the urban area construction selected this name. Also this General was the last owner of this land.

On 13 July 1989, the then Governor of Sinaloa Francisco Labastida Ochoa, made public Sinaloa State Congress approved status Juan José Ríos as a city.

== Sindicatura ==
In Sinaloa, municipalities are divided into smaller administrative units known as sindicaturas (Spanish: sindika'tuɾas), which are further divided into comisarías (Spanish: komisa'ɾi.as).

A male leader of a sindicatura is called a Síndico (Spanish: 'sindiko), while a female leader is called a Síndica (Spanish: 'sindika). Similarly, a male leader of a comisaría is called a Comisario (Spanish: komi'saɾjo), and a female leader is called a Comisaria (Spanish: komi'saɾja).

The Juan José Ríos sindicatura is located in northwestern Guasave Municipality. The seat of the sindicatura is the homonymous city.

It has an area of 960.24 ha, representing 27.71% of the total area of Guasave Municipality. It is the second-largest sindicatura in the municipality; the largest is the Central Sindicatura of Guasave.

Juan José Ríos sindicatura is divided into the Bachoco and Ejido Campo 38 comisarías.

== Municipality ==
Since a long time ago, Juan José Ríos inhabitants have requested many times of the Sinaloa Government, to create Juan José Ríos Municipality.

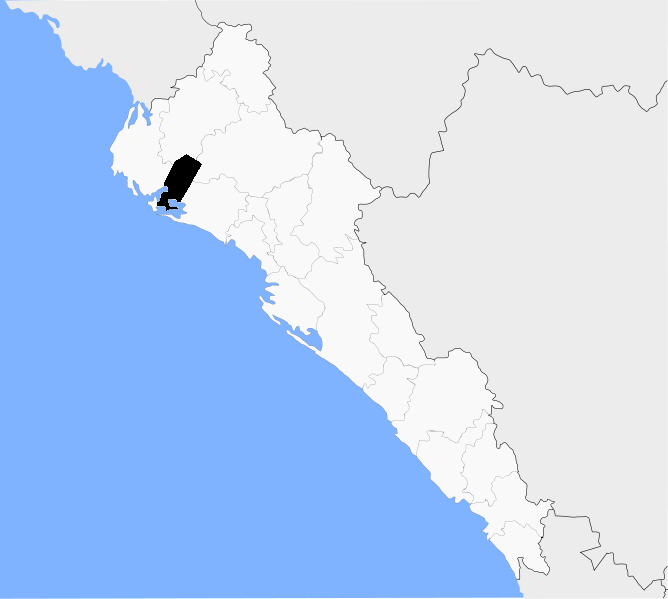
Hypothetical map of how Juan José Ríos Municipality could be

Juan José Ríos Municipality would be formed of:

- The present Juan José Ríos sindicatura
- Guasave Municipality localities:
  - Juan José Ríos
  - Bachoco
  - Guayparime
  - Ejido Héroes Mexicanos
  - Ejido Treinta y Ocho (Ejido Treinta y Ochito)
  - Campo Treinta y Ocho
  - Babujaqui
  - Poblado El Cerro Cabezón
- Ahome Municipality localities:
  - Juan José Ríos (El Estero)
  - Bachoco II (El Macochín)
  - Ejido Cerro Cabezón (El Chorrito)
  - Lázaro Cárdenas (El Muellecito)
  - Los Batequis
  - La Piedrera
  - El Carricito
- El Fuerte Municipality localities:
  - Ejido Tres Garantías
  - Agua de las Arenas
- Sinaloa Municipality locality:
  - El Amapal

=== Administrative divisions ===
Juan José Ríos Municipality seal would be the homonymous city, and it would be organized as:

- Central Sindicatura:
  - Sindicatura seal: Juan José Ríos
    - Comisarías:
      - Ejido Héroes Mexicanos
      - Ejido Treinta y Ocho (Ejido Treinta y Ochito)
      - Campo Treinta y Ocho
      - Ejido Tres Garantías
- Bachoco Sindicatura:
  - Sindicatura seal: Bachoco
    - Comisarías:
      - Poblado El Cerro Cabezón
      - Bachoco II (El Macochín)
      - Ejido Cerro Cabezón (El Chorrito)
      - Lázaro Cárdenas (El Muellecito)

== Geography ==
It located in Northern Sinaloa, in Fort Valley region, 20 km southwards Los Mochis, 43 km northwards Guasave and 208 km northwards Culiacán, which is Sinaloa state capital.

Its coordinate is 25°45'26 latitude north and 108°49'18 longitude west. Its altitude is 12 m above sea level.

=== Climate ===
Its climate is generally warm and humid. Its average annual temperature is 25.9 °C (78.6 °F). Its minimum annual temperature is 18 °C (64 °F) and its maximum annual temperature is 33.87 °C (92.97 °F), with May to October the hottest season. The average rain precipitation is 382 millimeters annually, with July to October the rainy season.

Climate data for Juan Jose Ríos (1951–2010)
| Month | Jan | Feb | Mar | Apr | May | Jun | Jul | Aug | Sep | Oct | Nov | Dec | Year |
|---|---|---|---|---|---|---|---|---|---|---|---|---|---|
| Record high °C (°F) | 36.0 (96.8) | 37.0 (98.6) | 40.0 (104.0) | 40.0 (104.0) | 41.0 (105.8) | 43.0 (109.4) | 42.5 (108.5) | 44.5 (112.1) | 44.5 (112.1) | 41.5 (106.7) | 40.0 (104.0) | 37.0 (98.6) | 44.5 (112.1) |
| Mean daily maximum °C (°F) | 28.2 (82.8) | 29.8 (85.6) | 31.2 (88.2) | 33.5 (92.3) | 35.4 (95.7) | 37.2 (99.0) | 38.0 (100.4) | 38.1 (100.6) | 37.6 (99.7) | 36.2 (97.2) | 32.5 (90.5) | 28.7 (83.7) | 33.9 (93.0) |
| Daily mean °C (°F) | 19.8 (67.6) | 20.8 (69.4) | 21.6 (70.9) | 23.3 (73.9) | 26.1 (79.0) | 30.0 (86.0) | 32.1 (89.8) | 32.2 (90.0) | 31.7 (89.1) | 28.9 (84.0) | 24.2 (75.6) | 20.5 (68.9) | 25.9 (78.6) |
| Mean daily minimum °C (°F) | 11.4 (52.5) | 11.7 (53.1) | 11.9 (53.4) | 13.2 (55.8) | 16.8 (62.2) | 22.8 (73.0) | 26.2 (79.2) | 26.3 (79.3) | 25.9 (78.6) | 21.5 (70.7) | 16.0 (60.8) | 12.3 (54.1) | 18.0 (64.4) |
| Record low °C (°F) | 3.0 (37.4) | 2.0 (35.6) | 2.0 (35.6) | 7.0 (44.6) | 10.0 (50.0) | 15.0 (59.0) | 24.0 (75.2) | 21.0 (69.8) | 21.0 (69.8) | 14.0 (57.2) | 8.0 (46.4) | 5.0 (41.0) | 2.0 (35.6) |
| Average rainfall mm (inches) | 16.9 (0.67) | 7.1 (0.28) | 2.4 (0.09) | 0.3 (0.01) | 3.4 (0.13) | 4.4 (0.17) | 66.8 (2.63) | 90.0 (3.54) | 104.7 (4.12) | 59.7 (2.35) | 15.9 (0.63) | 11.5 (0.45) | 383.1 (15.08) |
| Average precipitation days (≥ 0.1 mm) | 1.5 | 0.7 | 0.4 | 0.1 | 0.4 | 0.5 | 5.5 | 7.0 | 5.8 | 2.8 | 0.8 | 1.2 | 26.7 |
Source: Servicio Meteorologico Nacional

== Demographics ==
It had a population of 27,938 inhabitants (including both parts of the city − Guasave and Ahome municipalities); in which 13,761 were males and 14,177 were females, according to the 2010 census.

== Education ==
=== Universities ===
- Fort Valley Agriculture Superior School (UAS)

=== Schools ===
- Juan José Ríos UAS High School
- Cobaes 11 Lic. Alejandro Ríos Espinoza High School
- Conalep 117 Juan José Ríos High School

== Notable people ==
- Antonio Osuna, baseball player
- Roberto Osuna, baseball player
- Pancho Barraza, singer

== See also ==
- Guasave Municipality
- Ahome Municipality
- Guasave
- Los Mochis
- Sinaloa
