= Brecha =

Brecha may refer to:

- Brecha (2009 film), a Spanish film
- Brecha (newspaper), a Uruguayan political and cultural newspaper
- Brecha (street), a street in the Ciudad Vieja, Montevideo
- Brecha de Roldán, Spanish name for a natural gap in the Pyrenees
- La Brecha, a novel by Mercedes Valdivieso
- La Brecha, Sinaloa, a Mexican town
