= Municipalities of Sinaloa =

List of municipalities of Mexican state

Map of Mexico with Sinaloa highlighted

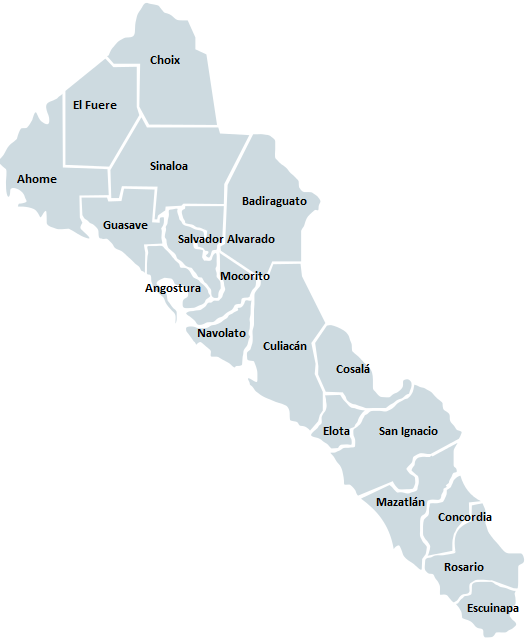
Municipalities of Sinaloa

Sinaloa is a state in northwest Mexico that is divided into 20 municipalities. According to the 2020 INEGI census, it is the seventeenth most populated state with 3,026,943 inhabitants and the eighteenth largest by land area spanning 57,365.4 square kilometres (22,148.9 sq mi).

Municipalities in Sinaloa have some administrative autonomy from the state according to the 115th article of the 1917 Constitution of Mexico. Every three years, citizens elect a municipal president (Spanish: presidente municipal) by a plurality voting system who heads a concurrently elected municipal council (ayuntamiento) responsible for providing all the public services for their constituents. The municipal council consists of a variable number of trustees and councillors (regidores y síndicos). Municipalities are responsible for public services (such as water and sewerage), street lighting, public safety, traffic, and the maintenance of public parks, gardens and cemeteries. They may also assist the state and federal governments in education, emergency fire and medical services, environmental protection and maintenance of monuments and historical landmarks. Since 1984, they have had the power to collect property taxes and user fees, although more funds are obtained from the state and federal governments than from their own income.

The largest municipality by population as of the 2020 census is Culiacán, with 1,003,530 residents (33.15% of the state's total), while the smallest is Cosalá with 17,012 residents. The largest municipality by land area is Sinaloa, with an area of 6,325.80 km^{2} (2,442.41 sq mi), and the smallest is Salvador Alvarado with 773.60 km^{2} (298.69 sq mi). The newest municipality is Juan José Ríos, established in 2024.

== Municipalities ==
Largest municipalities in Sinaloa by population

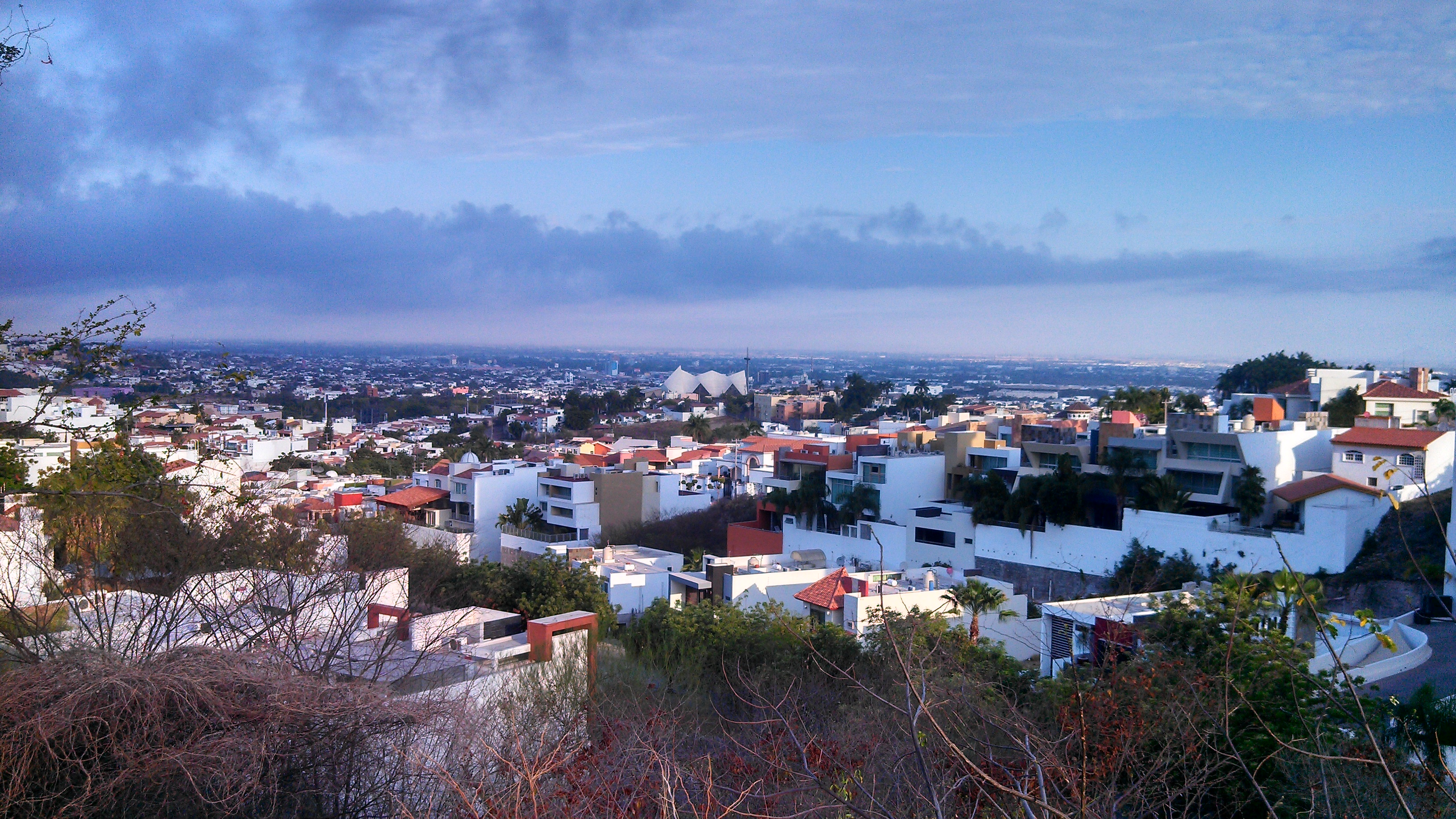
Culiacán is the capital and largest city by population.

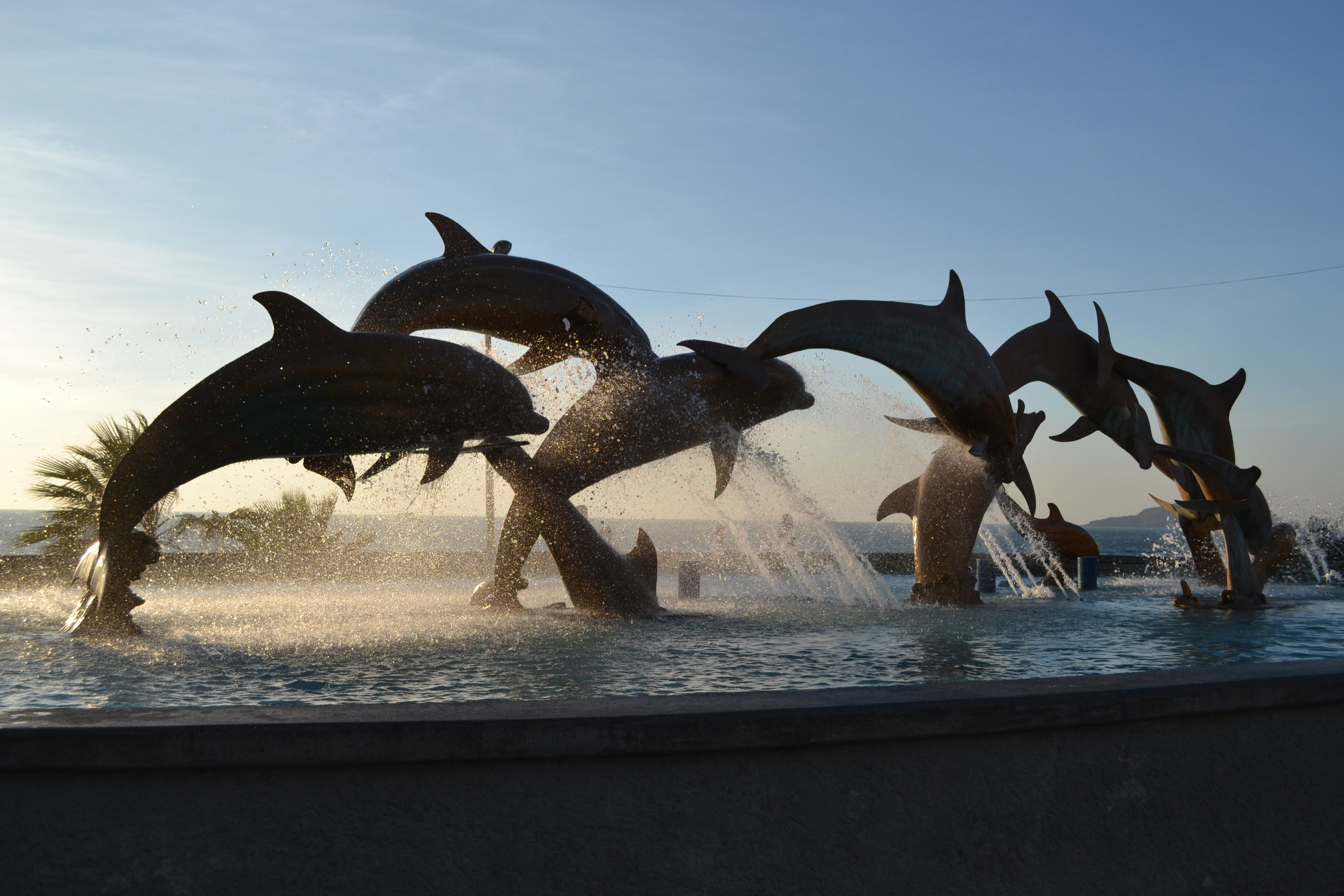
Mazatlán, second largest municipality by population

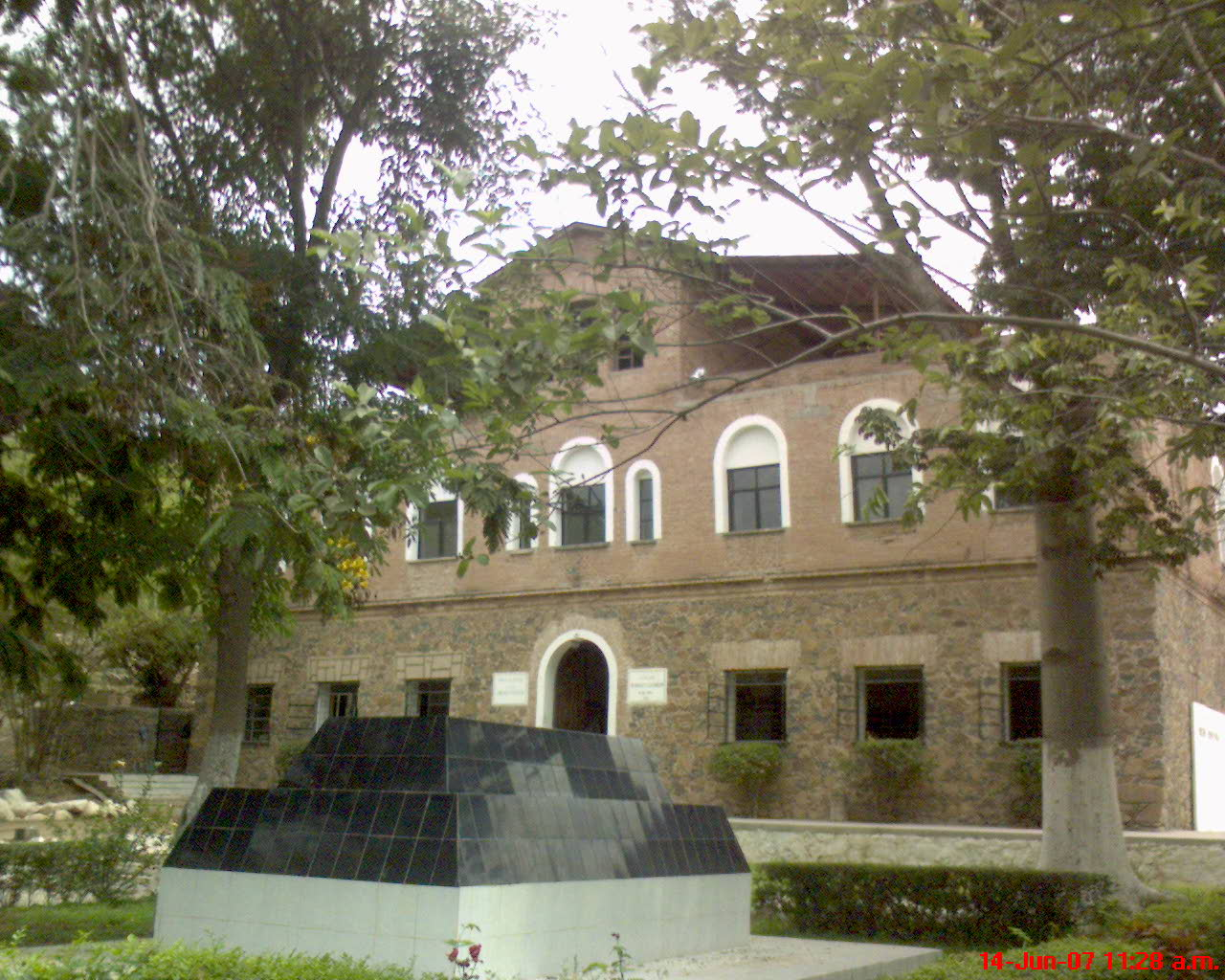
Ahome, third largest municipality by population

† State capital

Municipalities of Sinaloa
Name	Municipal seat	Population (2020)	Population (2010)	Change	Land area		Population density (2020)	Incorporation date
Name	Municipal seat	Population (2020)	Population (2010)	Change	km^{2}	sq mi	Population density (2020)	Incorporation date
Ahome	Los Mochis	459,310	416,299	+10.3%	3,995.4	1,542.6	115.0/km^{2} (297.7/sq mi)	December 26, 1916
Angostura	Angostura	44,093	44,993	−2.0%	1,902.0	734.4	23.2/km^{2} (60.0/sq mi)	December 7, 1916
Badiraguato	Badiraguato	26,542	29,999	−11.5%	4,836.3	1,867.3	5.5/km^{2} (14.2/sq mi)	December 15, 1831
Concordia (Note: Concordia was originally incorporated as San Sebastián, changing its name on September 5, 1828.)	Concordia	24,899	28,493	−12.6%	2,167.3	836.8	11.5/km^{2} (29.8/sq mi)	November 2, 1825
Cosalá	Cosalá	17,012	16,697	+1.9%	2,172.0	838.6	7.8/km^{2} (20.3/sq mi)	November 2, 1825
Culiacán	Culiacán	1,003,530	858,638	+16.9%	6,305.0	2,434.4	159.2/km^{2} (412.2/sq mi)	November 2, 1825
Choix	Choix	29,334	32,998	−11.1%	3,214.7	1,241.2	9.1/km^{2} (23.6/sq mi)	December 15, 1831
El Fuerte	El Fuerte	96,593	97,536	−1.0%	4,169.8	1,610.0	23.2/km^{2} (60.0/sq mi)	November 2, 1825
Eldorado (Note: The municipality of Eldorado was created from the sindicatura (municipal office) of the same name in Culiacán on March 23, 2021, and this change is not included in the 2020 or 2010 census figures. The population of Eldorado is 46,628 as of the 2020 census, and its area is 586.56 square kilometres (226.47 sq mi).)	Eldorado	—	—	—	—	—	—	March 23, 2021
Elota	La Cruz	55,339	42,907	+29.0%	1,643.4	634.5	33.7/km^{2} (87.2/sq mi)	April 17, 1917
Escuinapa	Escuinapa	59,988	54,131	+10.8%	1,554.6	600.2	38.6/km^{2} (99.9/sq mi)	October 19, 1915
Guasave	Guasave	289,370	285,912	+1.2%	2,938.2	1,134.4	98.5/km^{2} (255.1/sq mi)	December 5, 1916
Juan José Ríos (Note: The municipality of Juan José Ríos was created from the municipalities of Ahome, El Fuerte, Guasave and Sinaloa on November 1, 2024, and this change is not included in the 2020 or 2010 census figures.)	Juan José Ríos	—	—	—	—	—	—	March 23, 2021
Mazatlán (Note: Mazatlán was originally incorporated as Villa de la Unión, changing its name on January 31, 1852.)	Mazatlán	501,441	438,434	+14.4%	2,531.4	977.4	198.1/km^{2} (513.0/sq mi)	November 15, 1831
Mocorito	Mocorito	40,358	45,847	−12.0%	2,800.6	1,081.3	14.4/km^{2} (37.3/sq mi)	November 15, 1831
Navolato	Navolato	149,122	135,603	+10.0%	2,330.7	899.9	64.0/km^{2} (165.7/sq mi)	August 27, 1982
Rosario	Rosario	52,345	45,847	+14.2%	2,634.7	1,017.3	19.9/km^{2} (51.5/sq mi)	November 2, 1825
Salvador Alvarado	Guamúchil	79,492	79,085	+0.5%	773.6	298.7	102.8/km^{2} (266.1/sq mi)	March 6, 1962
San Ignacio	San Ignacio	19,505	22,527	−13.4%	5,070.1	1,957.6	3.8/km^{2} (10.0/sq mi)	November 2, 1825
Sinaloa	Sinaloa de Leyva	78,670	88,282	−10.9%	6,325.8	2,442.4	12.4/km^{2} (32.2/sq mi)	November 2, 1825
Sinaloa	—	3,026,943	2,767,761	+9.4%	57,365.4	22,148.9	52.8/km^{2} (136.7/sq mi)	—
Mexico	—	126,014,024	112,336,538	+12.2%	1,960,646.7	757,010	64.3/km^{2} (166.5/sq mi)	—
