= Antonio Osuna =

Mexican baseball player (born 1973)

- Pitcher
- Born: April 12, 1973 (age 53); Juan José Ríos, Sinaloa, Mexico
- Batted: Right Threw: Right

MLB debut
- April 25, 1995, for the Los Angeles Dodgers

Last MLB appearance
- April 10, 2005, for the Washington Nationals

MLB statistics
- Win–loss record: 36–29
- Earned run average: 3.68
- Strikeouts: 501
- Stats at Baseball Reference

Teams
- Los Angeles Dodgers (1995–2000); Chicago White Sox (2001–2002); New York Yankees (2003); San Diego Padres (2004); Washington Nationals (2005)

Career highlights and awards
- Mexican League Rookie of the Year Award (1992)

Antonio Pedro Osuna (born April 12, 1973) is a Mexican former professional baseball pitcher. He played parts of 11 seasons in Major League Baseball (MLB) for the Los Angeles Dodgers, Chicago White Sox, New York Yankees, San Diego Padres, and Washington Nationals.

== Career ==
Nicknamed "El Cañón" (The Cannon) in his native Mexico, Osuna signed with the Los Angeles Dodgers in 1991, and made his major league debut with them in 1995, appearing in 39 games for them that year. Going into 1995, he had been the Dodgers #2 prospect and #15 overall as rated by Baseball America. Osuna posted earned run averages of 3.00, 2.19, and 3.06 over the next three seasons. On March 17, 2001, he was traded to the Chicago White Sox with minor leaguer Carlos Ortega for Gary Majewski and minor leaguers Andre Simpson and Orlando Rodriguez. Osuna spent time on the disabled list in 2001 and played only 4 games for the White Sox. In the 2002 season, Osuna appeared in 59 games with a 3.86 ERA. On January 15, 2003, he was traded to the New York Yankees with minor leaguer Delvis Lantigua for Orlando Hernández.

Osuna became a free agent after the 2003 season and signed with the San Diego Padres. A free agent again after the 2004 season, Osuna signed with the Washington Nationals. He pitched only 2 1/3 innings with the Nats, giving up 11 earned runs before he was placed on the disabled list on April 18. Osuna was released after the season.

In 2007, Osuna pitched in the Triple-A Mexican League for the Tigres de Quintana Roo recording a 1.61 ERA in 22 games and being named to the midseason All-Star team. He played for them again in 2008, but recorded a 7.94 ERA in only 11 games.

== Pitching style ==
Osuna's pitch repertoire (by 1997) included a four-seam fastball, a curveball, and a changeup.

== Personal life ==
Osuna and his wife Arcelia have 3 children: Lohami, Lenix, and Yorvit.

On August 30, 2011, his nephew Roberto Osuna was signed by the Toronto Blue Jays. Osuna was only 16 years old at the time of signing. He had been ranked fourth by Baseball America in projected signing bonus rankings. Another nephew, Alejandro Osuna, currently plays in MLB for the Texas Rangers.
