= Siège social =

Basis for nationality of corporations

Siège social (French, usually translated as "head office") is a concept in international law for determining the nationality of companies. It is essentially based on effective nationality, as opposed to “paper nationality”, where the company has been incorporated. However, the effective nationality requires a genuine link to the corporate activity and describes the nationality based on the location of the actual activity of the corporation by where the owners are or the actual business is done.

According to the criterion of siège social, siège réel or siege réel social, a company's nationality derives from “the place where the legal entity's judicial and economic integration is situated”. In other words, it is the company's principal place of establishment.

== See also ==
- Seat (legal entity)
