= Guasave Municipality =

Municipality in the Mexican state of Sinaloa

Guasave Municipality Municipio de Guasave
- Municipality
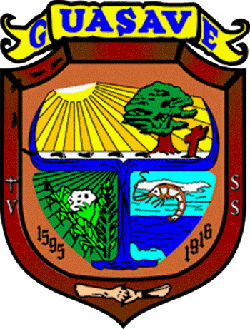
- Coat of arms

- Location of the municipality in Sinaloa
- Coordinates: 25°34′28″N 108°28′14″W
- Country: Mexico
- State: Sinaloa
- Foundation: 1916
- Seat: Guasave
- No. of Sindicaturas: 12

Government
  - Municipal president: Martin de Jesus Ahumada Quintero

Area
  - Total: 3,464.41 km^{2} (1,337.62 sq mi)

Population (2010)
  - Total: 285,912
  - Density: 82.5283/km^{2} (213.747/sq mi)
- Time zone: UTC-7 (Mountain Standard Time)
- Website: Guasave Government page

Guasave is a municipality in the Mexican state of Sinaloa in northwestern Mexico. Its seat is Guasave city.

== Political subdivision ==
Guasave Municipality is subdivided in 12 sindicaturas:

Sindicatura	Seat	Comisarías	Urban Area (Seat)
Juan José Ríos	Juan José Ríos	Bachoco; Ejido Campo 38	969.24 ha (3.7423 sq mi; 9.6924 km^{2})
Adolfo Ruiz Cortines	Adolfo Ruiz Cortines	Cerro Cabezón; Corerepe; Miguel Alemán; Jesús María	295.17 ha (1.1397 sq mi; 2.9517 km^{2})
Gabriel Leyva Solano	Gabriel Leyva Solano	La Entrada; Huitussi; San Fernando	201.79 ha (0.7791 sq mi; 2.0179 km^{2})
La Trinidad	La Trinidad	Las Moras; Las Juntas; Los Hornos	124.74 ha (0.4816 sq mi; 1.2474 km^{2})
León Fonseca	León Fonseca	Portugués de Gálvez; El Sabino; El Zopilote	148.91 ha (0.5749 sq mi; 1.4891 km^{2})
Nío	Nío	Camainero; Gambino; Pueblo Viejo; San Sebastián	184.59 ha (0.7127 sq mi; 1.8459 km^{2})
Bamoa	Bamoa	Choipa; Estación Bamoa; Orba	129.70 ha (0.5008 sq mi; 1.2970 km^{2})
San Rafael	San Rafael	Estación Capomas; Francisco R. Serrano; San Francisco de Capomas; Las Brisas; Palmarito de los Angulo; El Serranito	95.33 ha (0.3681 sq mi; 0.9533 km^{2})
El Burrión	El Burrión	La Cuestona; Guasavito; Ejido Javier Rojo Gómez; El Pitahayal; San José de Palos Blancos	128.51 ha (0.4962 sq mi; 1.2851 km^{2})
La Brecha	La Brecha	Casa Blanca; Colonia Ángel Flores; Valle de Uyaqui	131.12 ha (0.5063 sq mi; 1.3112 km^{2})
Tamazula	Tamazula	El Amole; Buenavista; Palos Verdes; El Progreso; El Sacrificio	116.77 ha (0.4509 sq mi; 1.1677 km^{2})
Central	Guasave		1,620.53 ha (6.2569 sq mi; 16.2053 km^{2})
