= Salvador Alvarado Municipality =

Municipality in the Mexican state of Sinaloa

Salvador Alvarado Municipality Municipio de Salvador Alvarado
- Municipality
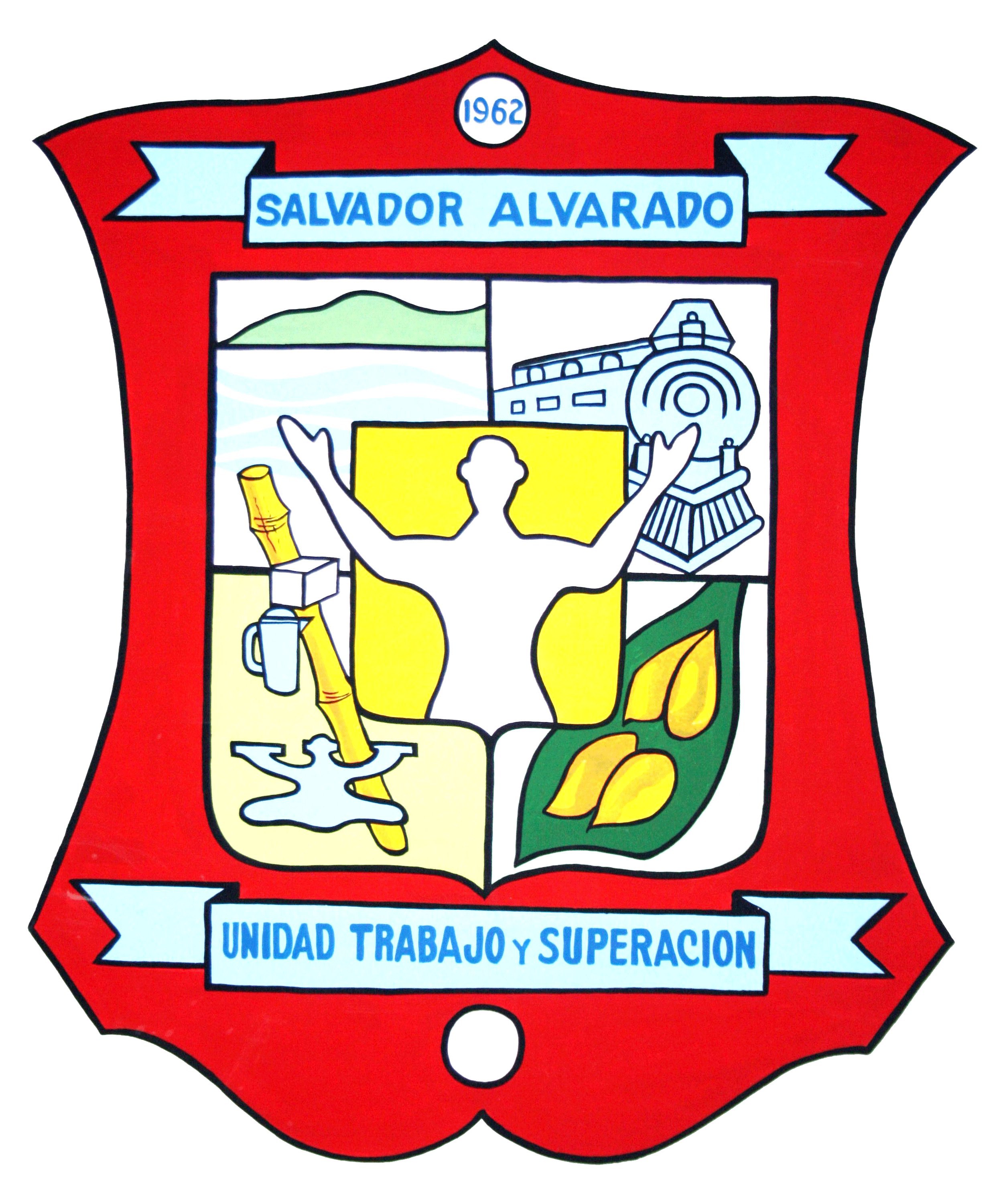
- Coat of arms

- Location of the municipality in Sinaloa
- Country: Mexico
- State: Sinaloa
- Seat: Guamúchil
- No. of Sindicaturas: 3
- Foundation: 1962

Government
  - Municipal president: Armando Camacho Aguilar

Area
  - Total: 1,197.5 km^{2} (462.4 sq mi)

Population (2010)
  - Total: 79,085
- Time zone: UTC-7 (Mountain Standard Time)
- Website: Salvador Alvarado Government page

Salvador Alvarado (Spanish pronunciation: [salβaˈðoɾ alβaˈɾaðo]) is a municipality in the Mexican state of Sinaloa, being the smallest municipality in Sinaloa. It stands at 25°08′09″N 107°51′45″W.

The municipality reported 79,085 inhabitants in the 2010 census and has an areal extent of 1,197.5 km^{2} (462.36 sq mi). Its municipal seat is the city of Guamúchil. The largest other community in the municipality is the town of Benito Juárez (population 5,128).
