= Roberto Osuna =

Mexican baseball player (born 1995)

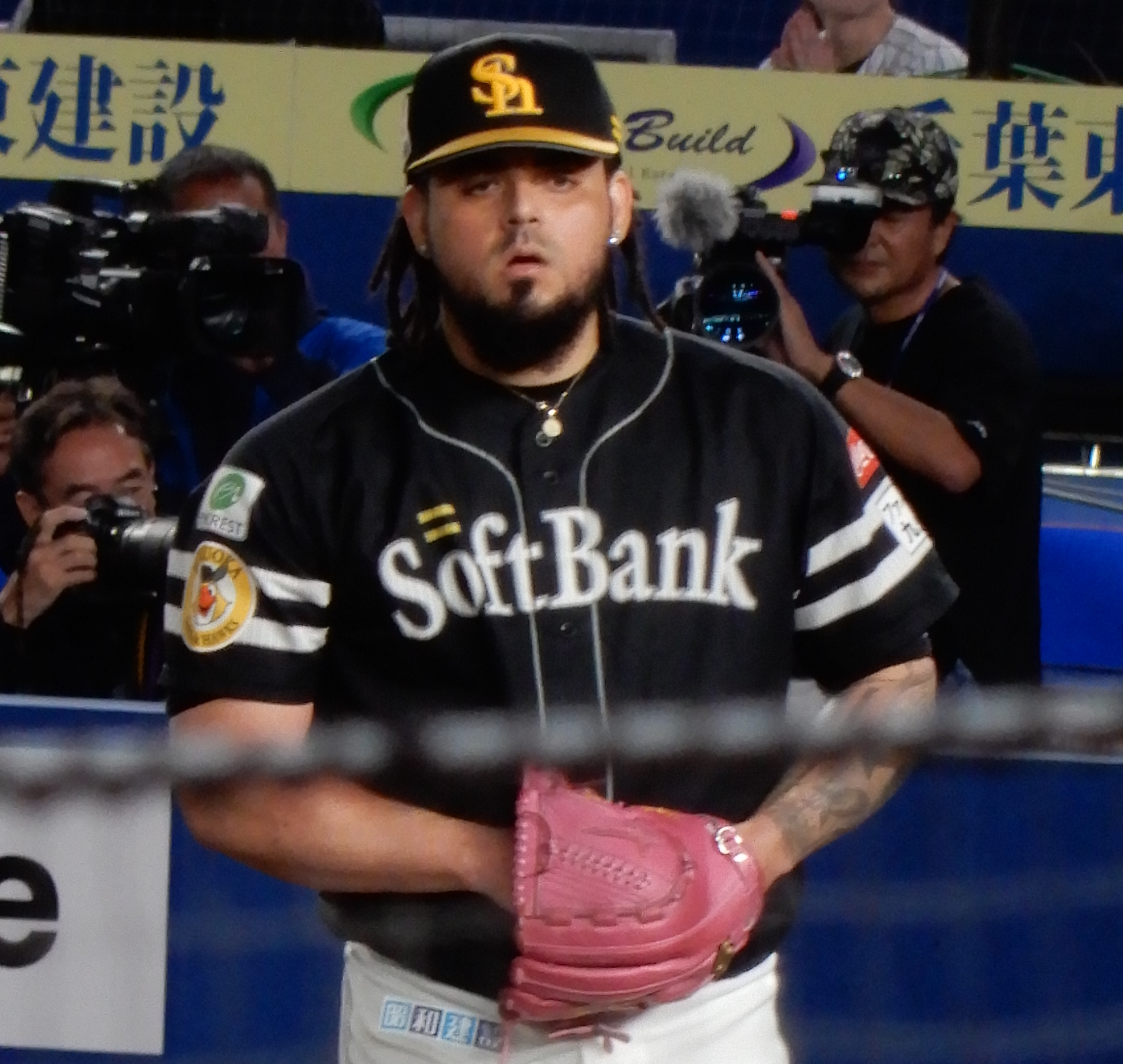
- Osuna with the Fukuoka SoftBank Hawks.

Fukuoka SoftBank Hawks – No. 54
- Pitcher
- Born: February 7, 1995 (age 31); Juan José Ríos, Sinaloa, Mexico
- Bats: Right Throws: Right

Professional debut
- MLB: April 8, 2015, for the Toronto Blue Jays
- NPB: June 24, 2022, for the Chiba Lotte Marines

MLB statistics (through 2020 season)
- Win–loss record: 14–18
- Earned run average: 2.74
- Strikeouts: 348
- Saves: 155

NPB statistics (through 2026 season)
- Win–loss record: 12–9
- Earned run average: 2.34
- Strikeouts: 154
- Saves: 68
- Stats at Baseball Reference

Teams
- Toronto Blue Jays (2015–2018); Houston Astros (2018–2020); Chiba Lotte Marines (2022); Fukuoka SoftBank Hawks (2023–present)

Career highlights and awards
- MLB: All-Star (2017); AL saves leader (2019); NPB: NPB All-Star (2023); 2× Japan Series champion (2025, 2026)

Roberto Osuna Quintero Jr. (born February 7, 1995) is a Mexican professional baseball pitcher for the Fukuoka SoftBank Hawks of Nippon Professional Baseball (NPB). He has previously played in Major League Baseball (MLB) for the Toronto Blue Jays and Houston Astros.

Osuna was signed by the Blue Jays out of Mexico as a 16-year-old. He made his major league debut in 2015 at 20 years old, becoming the youngest pitcher in Blue Jays history and the first player born in 1995 to play in MLB. Osuna was named an All-Star in 2017. In April 2018, he became the youngest pitcher in MLB history to record 100 saves (23 years, 62 days).

A month later, Osuna was arrested for domestic violence and suspended for 75 games by MLB soon after. During his suspension, the Astros acquired him via trade. He led the American League with 38 saves the next season. In 2020, Osuna suffered an elbow injury and the Astros released him after the season. He has played overseas since.

== Early life ==
Osuna was born in Juan José Ríos, Sinaloa, Mexico. At age 11 he dropped out of school to pick vegetables to help support his family. When he was 16 years old, the Toronto Blue Jays signed him with a $1.5 million signing bonus.

== Professional career ==
=== Minor leagues ===
Osuna made his professional baseball debut with the Diablos Rojos del México of the Mexican League in 2011. In 13 appearances totaling 19 2/3 innings, he pitched to a 0–1 record, 5.49 earned run average (ERA), and 12 strikeouts.

In August 2011, Osuna was acquired by the Blue Jays for $1.5 million. He began the 2012 season with the Bluefield Blue Jays of the Appalachian League, but was promoted to the Vancouver Canadians of the Northwest League after posting a 1–0 record with a 1.50 earned run average in seven appearances (four starts). He made his Canadians debut on July 28, 2012, striking out a franchise-record 13 batters over five innings pitched. In total, Osuna pitched 43 2/3 innings in 2012, and posted a 2–0 record, 2.27 ERA, and 49 strikeouts.

On January 29, 2013, Osuna was ranked 90th on MLB's Top 100 Prospects list. He started the 2013 season with the Class-A Lansing Lugnuts of the Midwest League. On May 9, 2013, it was announced that Osuna had torn his ulnar collateral ligament, an injury that usually requires Tommy John surgery. He met with Dr. James Andrews, and was advised to rest and rehab the injury, rather than undergo surgery. Osuna returned from the disabled list on June 9, and pitched five shutout innings for Lansing. Despite his attempt to rehab his elbow, Osuna underwent Tommy John surgery in late June. On July 26, he was ranked 58th on MLB's revised Top 100 Prospects list, and the number two prospect in the Blue Jays organization.

Osuna made his first rehab appearance since the procedure on July 8, 2014, and pitched one inning for the Gulf Coast League Blue Jays. He was then promoted to the High-A Dunedin Blue Jays and made seven starts before the end of the season, posting a 0–2 record, a 6.55 ERA, and 30 strikeouts in 22 innings pitched. In the 2015 preseason prospect rankings, he was named the number six prospect in the Blue Jays organization by MLB.

=== Toronto Blue Jays ===
==== 2015 ====
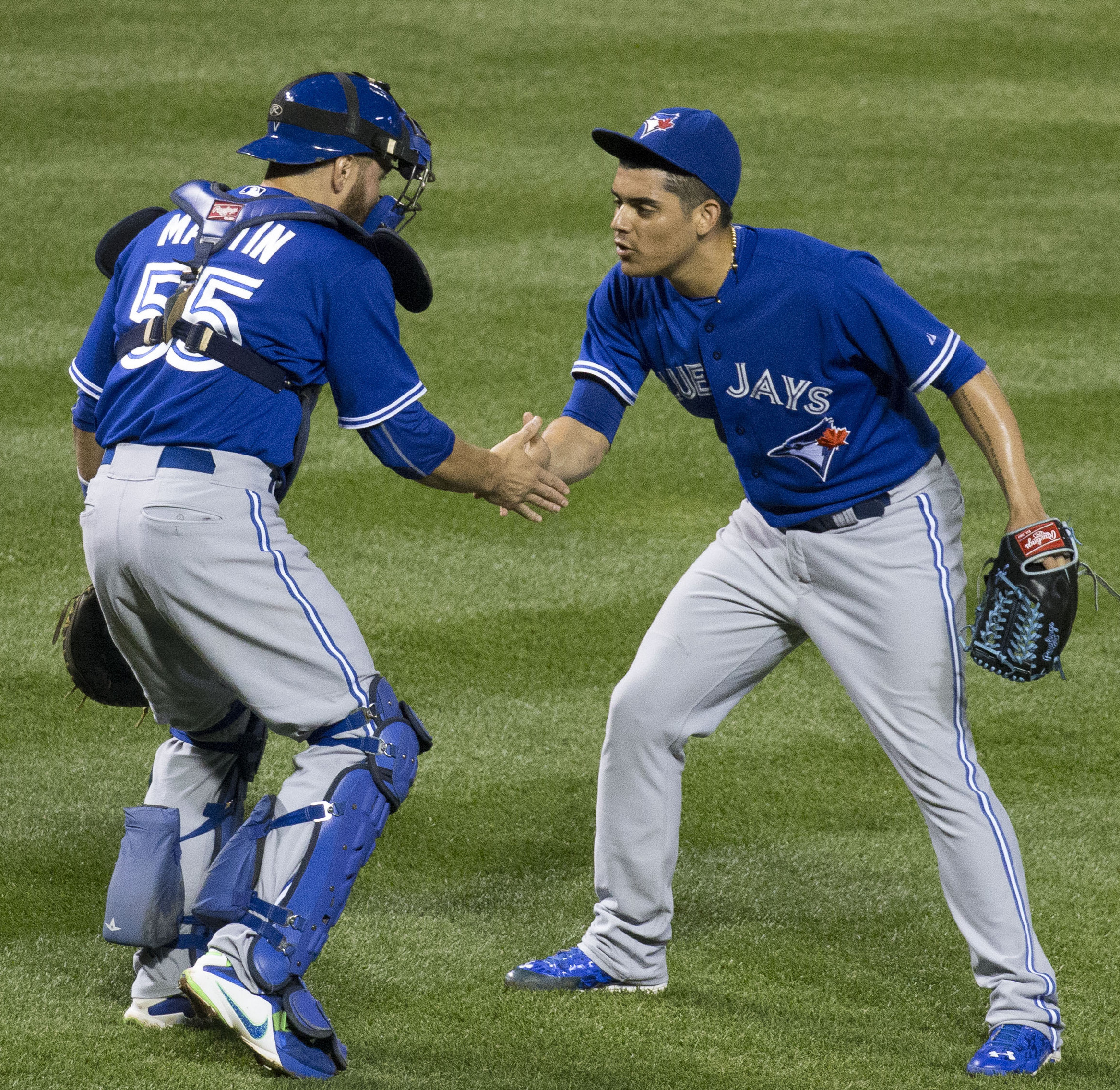
Osuna celebrates his 20th save of the 2015 season with Russell Martin

Osuna was invited to spring training in 2015 as a non-roster invitee. While initially not expecting to have any chance at making the major league team out of camp, Osuna impressed Blue Jays management through the first half of the spring. On March 22, he started a game against the Tampa Bay Rays and pitched 3 2/3 scoreless innings. After Steve Delabar was optioned to minor league camp on March 26, it was reported that Osuna would likely make the Opening Day roster as a reliever. His position on the roster was confirmed on March 31.

Osuna made his Major League debut in a game against the New York Yankees on April 8, 2015, striking out Alex Rodriguez and getting Stephen Drew to flyout. In making his debut, Osuna became the youngest pitcher to appear in a Major League game for Toronto, at 20 years and 60 days old. Through the first month of the season, Osuna became the most reliable arm in the bullpen for the Blue Jays, posting a 1.38 ERA through his first 10 appearances. He earned his first win on May 18, pitching 1 2/3 scoreless innings in a 10–6 victory over the Los Angeles Angels of Anaheim. In doing so, Osuna became the youngest pitcher to earn a win for the Blue Jays, at 20 years and 100 days old. He earned his first career save on June 22, closing out an 8–5 win over the Tampa Bay Rays. On August 7, Osuna became the youngest player in MLB history to record an extra-innings save, when he closed out a 2–1 win over the New York Yankees in the 10th inning. Osuna finished the 2015 regular season with a 1–6 record, 20 saves, 2.58 ERA, and 75 strikeouts in 69 2/3 innings pitched, and was the youngest player in the AL.

In the 2015 American League Division Series, Osuna recorded a five-out save in the fifth and final game, and in doing so became the youngest pitcher in American League history to record a save in the postseason, as well as the second-youngest to do so in MLB history, behind Don Gullett in 1970. Osuna pitched in 4 of the 5 ALDS games, and did not allow a baserunner in 5 2/3 innings pitched. He finished fourth in American League Rookie of the Year, receiving two second-place votes and two third-place votes.

==== 2016 ====
During the offseason, the Blue Jays acquired reliever Drew Storen, who had been the Washington Nationals' closer for part of the 2015 season. After a competition between Osuna and Storen for the closer's role in spring training, manager John Gibbons announced on March 30 that Osuna would begin the season as the Blue Jays closer. He earned his first save of the season on April 3 (Opening Day), sealing a 5–3 win for Marcus Stroman. At the age of 21 years, 56 days, he became the youngest pitcher in MLB history to record an Opening Day save. On August 13, Osuna closed out a 4–2 win over the Houston Astros to earn the 46th save of his career, which tied the mark set by Terry Forster for saves recorded before the age of 22. He would break the tie with Forster on August 17, saving a 7–4 win over the New York Yankees. Osuna earned his 30th save of the 2016 season on September 4, becoming the 11th pitcher in franchise history to record 30 saves in a season. The save was also the 50th of his career, making him the youngest pitcher in MLB history to reach 50 saves.

Osuna finished the 2016 regular season with a 4–3 record, 2.68 ERA, 82 strikeouts, and 36 saves (6th in the AL) in 74 innings pitched over 72 games (4th) as he finished 61 games (2nd) and was the 4th-youngest player in the AL. In the postseason, he added nine innings and did not allow a run. He also earned his first career postseason win, pitching two perfect innings in the Blue Jays' decisive Game 3 victory of the ALDS.

On December 5, 2016, Osuna committed to play for Team Mexico at the 2017 World Baseball Classic.

==== 2017 ====
Osuna was diagnosed with a cervical spasm late in spring training and started the 2017 season on the 10-day disabled list. On June 24, it was revealed that Osuna was dealing with an anxiety issue. To that point in the season, he had recorded 19 saves and a 2.48 ERA, and had become the youngest player in MLB history to reach 75 career saves. Osuna made his return to the mound the following day, pitching the final inning of the Blue Jays' 8–2 victory over the Kansas City Royals. On July 7, Osuna was added to the American League roster for the 2017 Major League Baseball All-Star Game. Osuna earned his 35th save of the season on August 31, and in doing so, became the first player in franchise history to have back-to-back seasons with at least 35 saves. He finished the season with 39 saves (2nd in the AL) and a 3–4 record, 3.38 ERA, and 83 strikeouts in 64 innings (11.7 per 9 innings) as he finished 58 games (2nd). However, he led the majors in blown saves, with 10.

==== 2018 ====
Osuna was unable to come to an agreement on a contract with the Blue Jays for 2018, leading to salary arbitration. On February 3, he lost his case with the Blue Jays and was signed to a one-year, $5.3 million contract. Osuna recorded his 100th career save in Toronto's 2–1 win over the Baltimore Orioles on April 10. In doing so, he became the youngest pitcher in MLB history to reach 100 saves. On June 22, Osuna was suspended for 75 games, retroactive to May 8, due to violating the league's policy on domestic assault.

=== Houston Astros ===
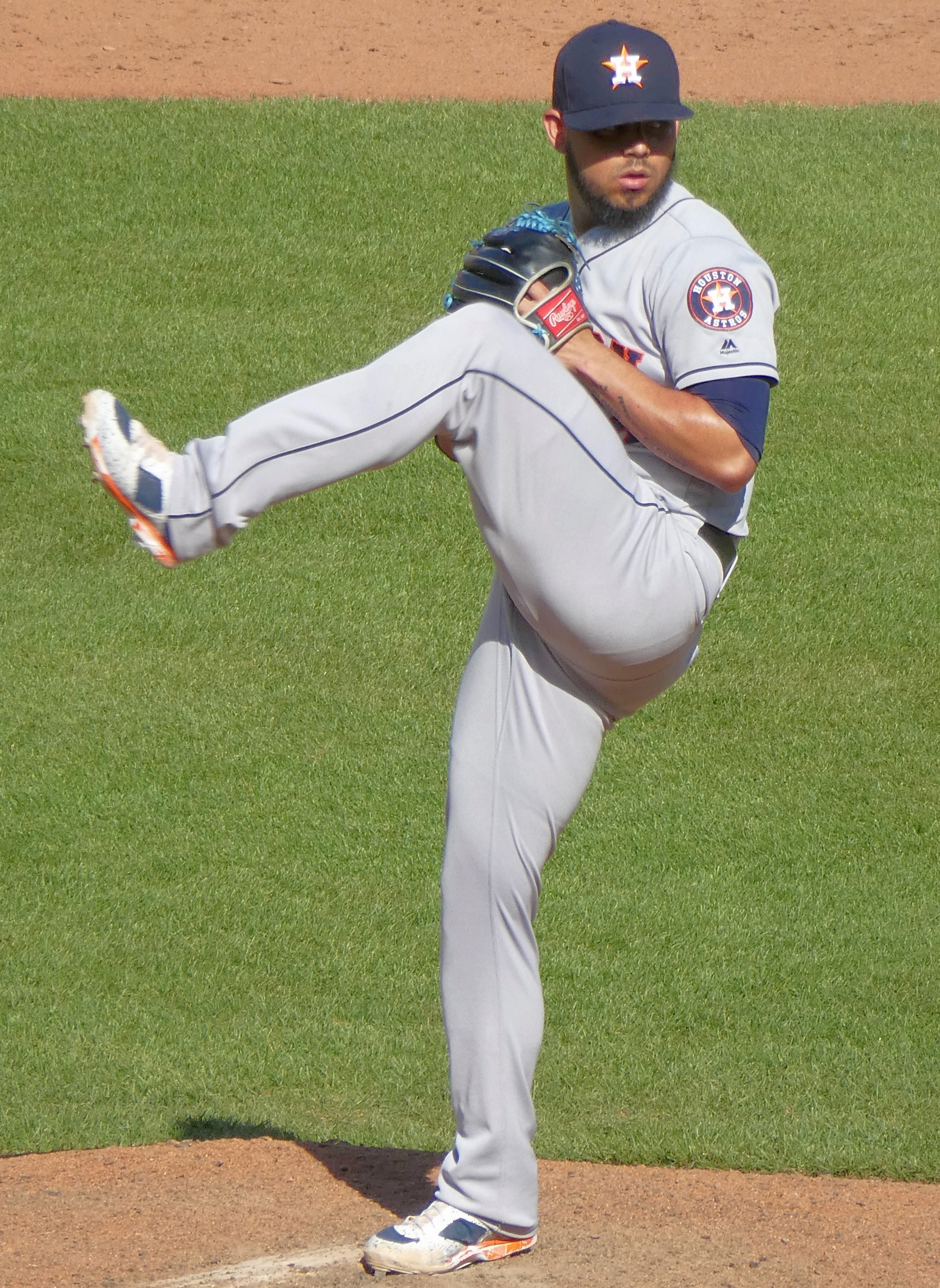
Osuna with the Houston Astros in 2019

On July 30, 2018, the Blue Jays traded Osuna to the Houston Astros for pitchers Ken Giles, Héctor Pérez, and David Paulino. The Astros reinstated him to their active roster on August 5. He was loudly booed in his first appearance in Toronto as a member of the Astros. In 2018, between the two teams he was 2–2 with 21 saves and a 2.37 ERA.

In 2019, Osuna led the American League with 38 saves and 56 games finished. He also recorded a 2.63 ERA and 73 strikeouts in 65 innings. He was less effective in the playoffs, with a 3.60 ERA, 2 saves, one win after blowing a save, and 9 strikeouts in 10 innings as the Astros lost the World Series. He was in the bullpen when fellow reliever Will Harris gave up a decisive home run to Howie Kendrick in Game 7 of the World Series, entering the game two batters later.

On August 4, 2020, it was announced that Osuna was recommended to need Tommy John surgery. However, Osuna opted not to have the surgery and instead rest his arm for four weeks. He only pitched in 4 games in the shortened 2020 season, earning 1 save and allowing 1 run in 4 1/3 innings. On October 29, 2020, Osuna was placed on outright waivers by the Astros and became a free agent. He was predicted to make roughly $10 million in 2021 based on salary arbitration projections.

=== Diablos Rojos del México (second stint) ===
On March 12, 2021, Osuna held a showcase for interested teams in the Dominican Republic.

On May 11, Osuna signed with the Diablos Rojos del México of the Mexican League. He finished the season with a 3–0 record, 1.09 ERA, and 12 saves over 24.2 innings pitched. In 2022, Osuna registered a 2–0 record with a 1.35 ERA and 6 saves over 13.1 innings. On May 31, 2022, Osuna was placed on the reserve list in order to pursue an opportunity in Asia.

=== Chiba Lotte Marines ===
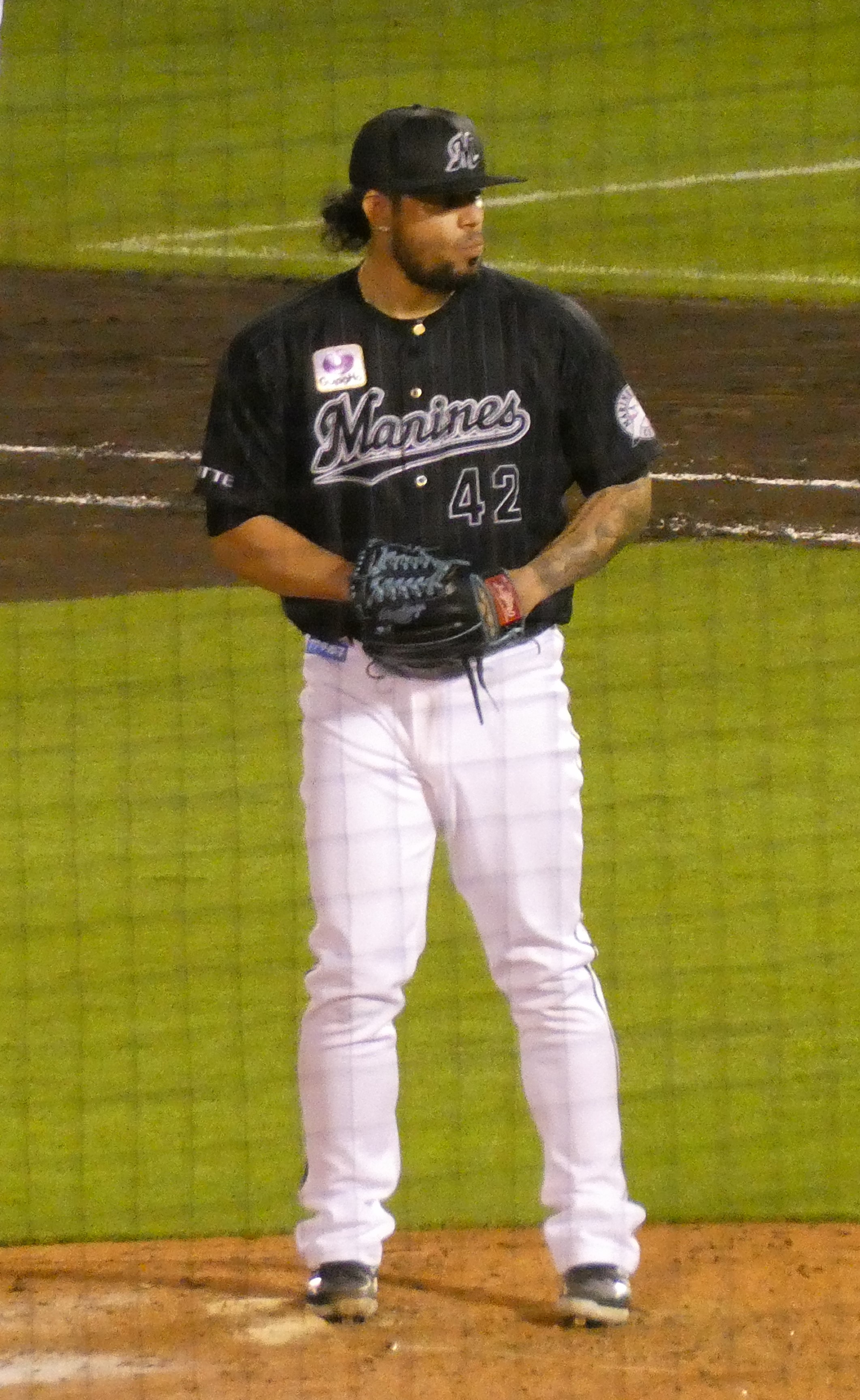
Osuna with the Chiba Lotte Marines.

On June 9, 2022, Osuna signed with the Chiba Lotte Marines of Nippon Professional Baseball. In 2022 season, he finished the regular season with 29 Games pitched, a 4–1 Win–loss record, 0.91 ERA, 9 holds, 10 saves, and 32 strikeouts in 29 2/3 innings.

=== Fukuoka SoftBank Hawks ===
On December 8, 2022, Osuna signed with the Fukuoka SoftBank Hawks. In 49 games for the Hawks in 2023, Osuna pitched to a 0.92 ERA with 42 strikeouts across 49 innings of work. He had a 3–2 record with 26 saves and 12 holds in 49 games. On November 11, 2023, Osuna re-signed with Fukuoka on a 4-year, $26.4 million contract.

Osuna had his worst season in Japan in 2024, with an 0–3 record, 3.76 ERA, 24 saves, and 23 strikeouts in 38 1/3 innings.

Osuna made 26 appearances for Fukuoka in 2025, posting a 3-1 record and 4.15 ERA with 16 strikeouts and eight saves over 26 innings of work. With the Hawks, Osuna won the 2025 Japan Series.

== Personal life ==
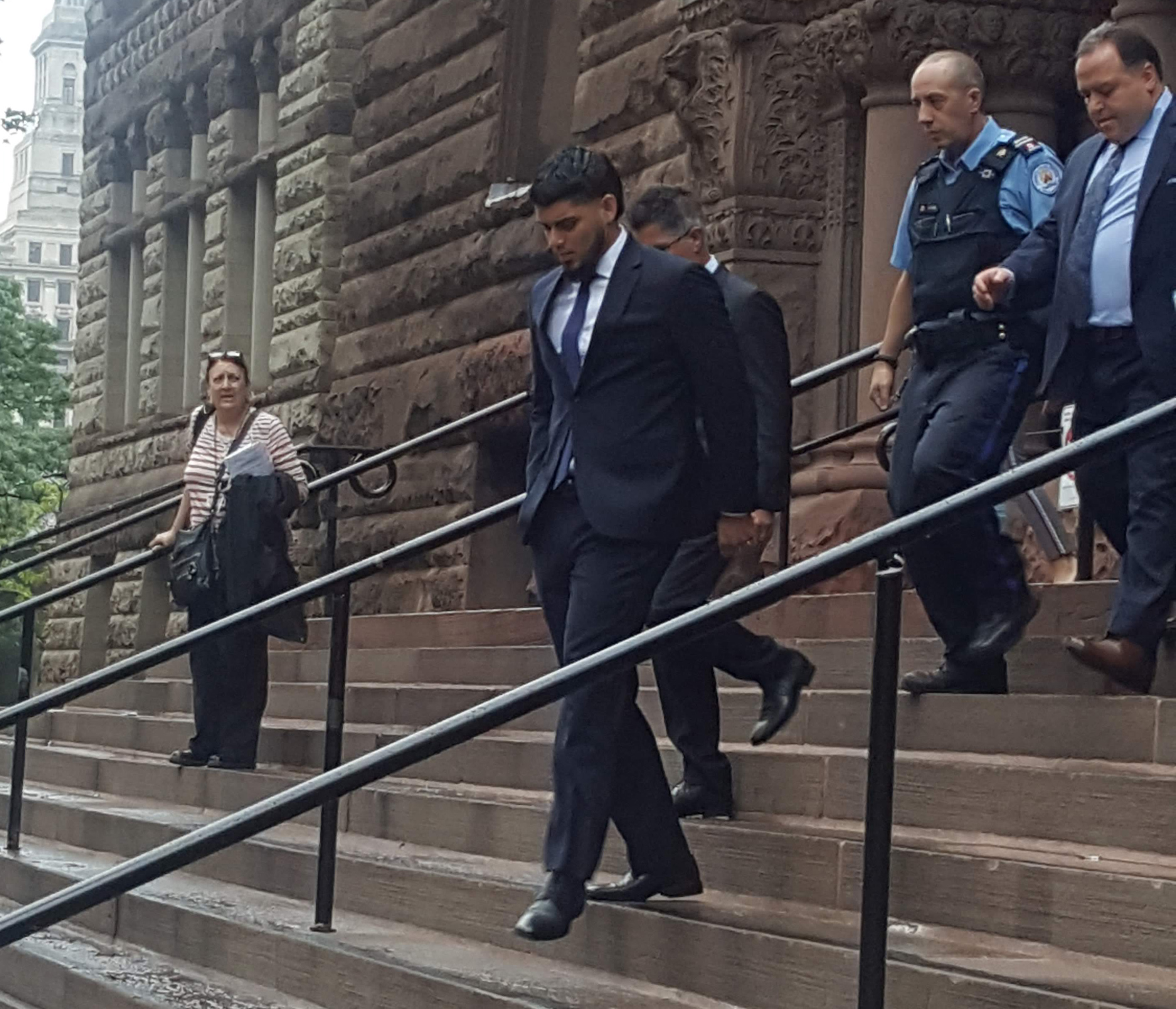
Osuna exits the Old City Hall courthouse in Toronto.

At the age of 12, Osuna quit school to help support his family, picking vegetables with his father, also named Roberto, who pitched in the Mexican League for 22 seasons and taught him to pitch while instructing him after the workday. Osuna's uncle, Antonio Osuna, pitched in MLB for 11 seasons, mostly with the Los Angeles Dodgers. Osuna's younger brother, Alejandro Osuna, plays in MLB for the Texas Rangers.

Osuna has a daughter, born in September 2017.

On May 8, 2018, Osuna was arrested by Toronto police and charged with assault. He allegedly assaulted Alejandra Roman Cota, the mother of his 3-year-old son. Roman Cota was visiting Toronto with their child. She returned to Mexico shortly afterward and refused to return to Toronto. Due to Roman Cota's refusal to testify, the prosecution withdrew the charge against Osuna in exchange for a peace bond, mandating that for one year he not have contact with the alleged victim without her consent. According to Toronto police sources, Roman Cota expressed her intention to resume contact with Osuna. He was placed on administrative leave by MLB commissioner Rob Manfred. On June 22, 2018, he received a 75-game suspension without pay for violating the league's domestic violence policy, retroactive to May 8.

== See also ==
- Houston Astros award winners and league leaders
- List of baseball players who underwent Tommy John surgery
- List of Major League Baseball players from Mexico

Awards and achievements
Preceded by Craig Kimbrel	American League Reliever of the Month; June 2017	Succeeded by Edwin Díaz
