= Cosalá Municipality =

Municipality in the Mexican state of Sinaloa

Coordinates: 24°24′45″N 106°41′27″W

Cosalá Municipality Municipio de Cosalá
- Municipality
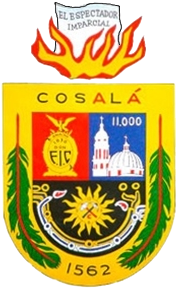
- Coat of arms

- Location of the municipality in Sinaloa
- Country: Mexico
- State: Sinaloa
- Seat: Cosalá
- No. of Sindicaturas: 5
- Foundation: 1915

Government
  - Municipal president: Juan José Martínez Mendoza

Area
  - Total: 2,665.12 km^{2} (1,029.01 sq mi)

Population (2010)
  - Total: 16,697
- Time zone: UTC-7 (Mountain Standard Time)
- Website: Cosalá Government page

Cosalá is a municipality in the Mexican state of Sinaloa in northwestern Mexico, being the least populous municipality in Sinaloa.

== Political subdivision ==
Cosalá Municipality is subdivided in 5 sindicaturas:

- Cosalá
- Guadalupe de los Reyes
- La Ilama
- San José de las Bocas
- Santa Cruz de Alaya
