= Alejandro Osuna =

Mexican baseball player (born 2002)

Texas Rangers – No. 19
- Outfielder
- Born: October 10, 2002 (age 23); Los Mochis, Sinaloa, Mexico
- Bats: Left Throws: Left

MLB debut
- May 25, 2025, for the Texas Rangers

MLB statistics (through 2026 season)
- Batting average: .239
- Home runs: 3
- Runs batted in: 40
- Stats at Baseball Reference

Teams
- Texas Rangers (2025–present)

Tadeo Alejandro Osuna (born October 10, 2002) is a Mexican professional baseball outfielder for the Texas Rangers of Major League Baseball (MLB). He made his MLB debut in 2025.

== Career ==
Osuna signed with the Texas Rangers as an international free agent on October 6, 2020. He made his professional debut in 2021 with the Down East Wood Ducks, hitting .224/.349/.383 with six home runs, 36 RBI, and 17 stolen bases. Osuna split the 2022 season between Down East and the Hickory Crawdads of the High-A South Atlantic League, hitting a combined .302/.378/.427 with nine home runs, 54 RBI, and 34 stolen bases. He returned to Hickory for the 2023 season, hitting .259/.381/.385 with five home runs, 35 RBI, and 16 stolen bases. Following that season, Osuna played for the Surprise Saguaros in the Arizona Fall League.

Osuna split the 2024 season between Hickory and the Frisco RoughRiders of the Double-A Texas League, hitting a combined .292/.362/.507 with 18 home runs, 61 RBI, and 17 stolen bases. Following the 2024 season, he once again played in the Fall League, hitting 306/.438/.449/.887. Osuna was subsequently named the Texas Rangers 2024 Tom Grieve Player of the Year. Osuna opened the 2025 season split between Frisco and the Round Rock Express of the Triple-A Pacific Coast League.

On May 25, 2025, Osuna was selected to the 40-man roster and promoted him to the major leagues for the first time. The next day, Osuna recorded his first career hit, notching a single off of Toronto Blue Jays starter Kevin Gausman. On July 1, Osuna hit his first career home run off of Brandon Young of the Baltimore Orioles. He made 63 appearances for the Rangers during his rookie season, batting .212/.313/.278 with two home runs, 15 RBI, and five stolen bases.

Osuna was optioned to Triple-A Round Rock to begin the 2026 season.

== Personal life ==
His brother, Roberto Osuna, and his uncle Antonio Osuna, both played in Major League Baseball (MLB).
