= Rosario Municipality, Sinaloa =

Municipality in the Mexican state of Sinaloa

Rosario Municipality Municipio de Rosario
- Municipality
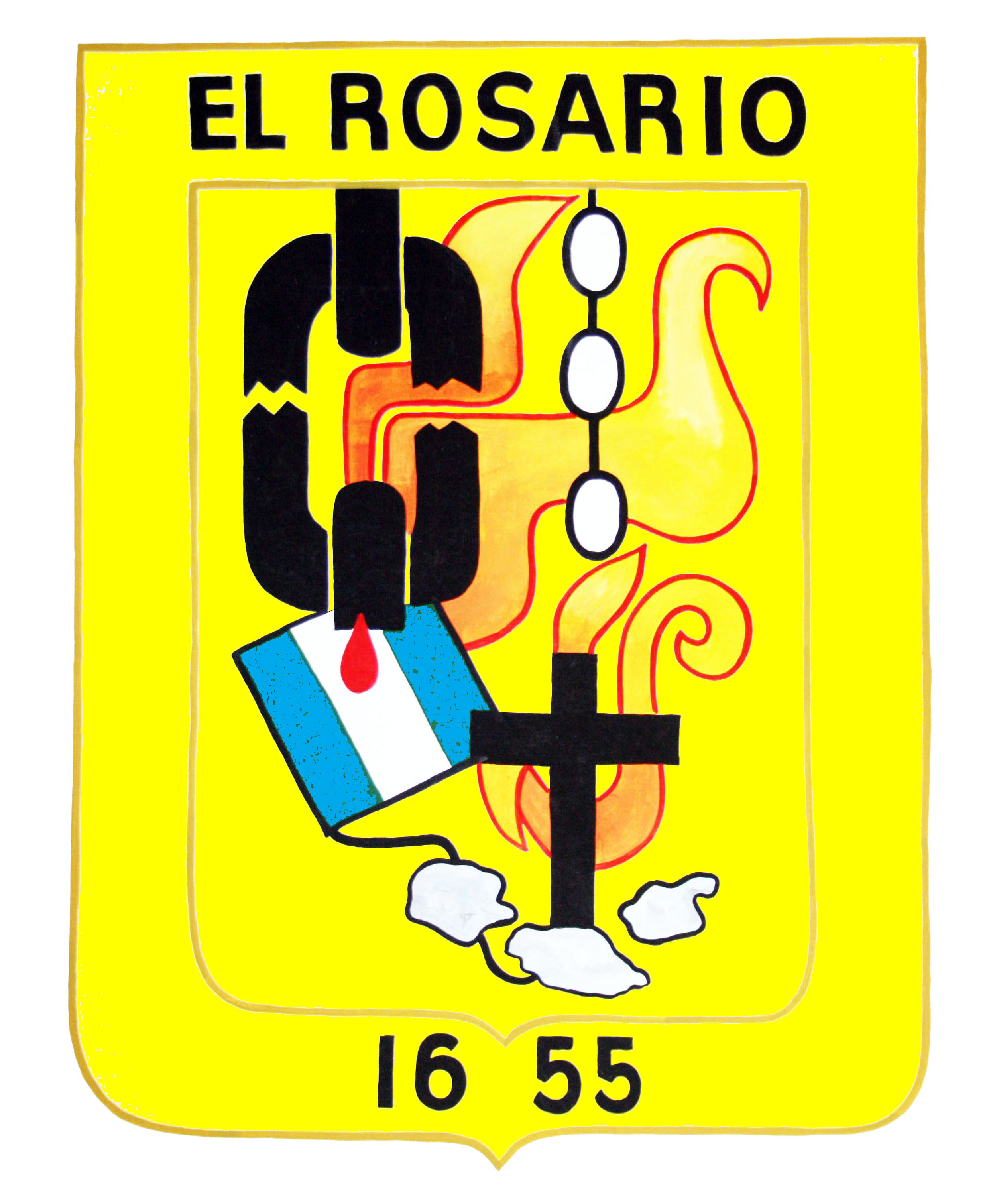
- Coat of arms

- Location of the municipality in Sinaloa
- Coordinates: 23.0176°N 105.8577°W
- Country: Mexico
- State: Sinaloa
- Seat: El Rosario
- No. of Sindicaturas: 8
- Foundation: 1915

Government
  - Municipal president: Ángel Alfonso Silva Santiago

Area
  - Total: 2,723.28 km^{2} (1,051.46 sq mi)

Population (2010)
  - Total: 49,380
- Time zone: UTC-7 (Mountain Standard Time)
- Website: Official website

Rosario is a municipality in the Mexican state of Sinaloa in northwestern Mexico, being the easternmost municipality in Sinaloa. Its seat is the city of El Rosario. According to the 2010 census it had 49,380 inhabitants.

== Political subdivision ==
Rosario Municipality is subdivided in 8 sindicaturas:

- Potrerillos
- Cacalotan
- Matatan
- La Rastra
- Maloya
- Pozole
- Aguaverde
- Chametla
