= Eldorado, Sinaloa =

Eldorado
- Municipality

- Location of Eldorado Eldorado (Mexico)
- Coordinates: 24°19′23″N 107°21′47″W
- Country: Mexico
- State: Sinaloa
- Incorporated: 23 March 2021
- Seat: Eldorado

Government
  - President: Faustino Torres Núñez

Area
  - Total: 586.56 km^{2} (226.47 sq mi)
- Elevation (of seat): 10 m (33 ft)

Population (2020 Census)
  - Total: 46,628
  - Density: 79.494/km^{2} (205.89/sq mi)
  - Seat: 14,772
- Time zone: UTC-7 (Pacific)
- Postal codes: 80450–80458
- Area code: 667

Eldorado is a municipality in the Mexican state of Sinaloa. It is located about 55 kilometres (34 mi) south of the state capital of Culiacán. It was created from the municipality of Culiacán in 2021 and it became operational on 1 November 2024.

== Geography ==
The municipality of Eldorado is located at the mouth of the San Lorenzo River in central Sinaloa. To the north and the east, it borders the sindicaturas or administrative subdivisions of Costa Rica, Quilá and Emiliano Zapata in the municipality of Culiacán. It borders the Ensenada de Pabellones lagoon, a Ramsar site, to the west; and the Gulf of California to the south. Eldorado has a desert climate.

Climate data for El Dorado weather station at 24°19′25″N 107°22′04″W, 10 m above sea level (1981–2010 averages, 1951–2010 extremes)
Month	Jan	Feb	Mar	Apr	May	Jun	Jul	Aug	Sep	Oct	Nov	Dec	Year
Record high °C (°F)	36.0 (96.8)	36.5 (97.7)	38.0 (100.4)	39.5 (103.1)	42.5 (108.5)	40.0 (104.0)	41.0 (105.8)	40.5 (104.9)	41.5 (106.7)	40.0 (104.0)	37.5 (99.5)	36.0 (96.8)	42.5 (108.5)
Mean daily maximum °C (°F)	28.9 (84.0)	30.5 (86.9)	31.2 (88.2)	32.5 (90.5)	34.1 (93.4)	34.6 (94.3)	36.0 (96.8)	35.9 (96.6)	35.6 (96.1)	35.4 (95.7)	32.9 (91.2)	29.2 (84.6)	33.1 (91.6)
Daily mean °C (°F)	20.5 (68.9)	21.7 (71.1)	22.5 (72.5)	24.2 (75.6)	26.5 (79.7)	29.3 (84.7)	30.7 (87.3)	30.6 (87.1)	30.4 (86.7)	28.7 (83.7)	25.0 (77.0)	21.1 (70.0)	25.9 (78.6)
Mean daily minimum °C (°F)	12.1 (53.8)	12.8 (55.0)	13.7 (56.7)	15.9 (60.6)	19.0 (66.2)	24.1 (75.4)	25.4 (77.7)	25.3 (77.5)	25.1 (77.2)	22.0 (71.6)	17.0 (62.6)	13.1 (55.6)	18.8 (65.8)
Record low °C (°F)	4.0 (39.2)	2.5 (36.5)	5.5 (41.9)	7.0 (44.6)	10.0 (50.0)	12.5 (54.5)	19.5 (67.1)	20.5 (68.9)	19.0 (66.2)	11.0 (51.8)	4.5 (40.1)	4.5 (40.1)	2.5 (36.5)
Average precipitation mm (inches)	11.4 (0.45)	4.5 (0.18)	3.0 (0.12)	4.6 (0.18)	0.4 (0.02)	19.0 (0.75)	61.6 (2.43)	100.8 (3.97)	149.6 (5.89)	42.8 (1.69)	24.5 (0.96)	16.3 (0.64)	438.5 (17.26)
Average precipitation days (≥ 0.1 mm)	1.4	0.5	0.7	0.6	0.3	1.2	6.8	10.6	7.0	2.5	1.3	1.4	34.3
Source: Servicio Meteorológico Nacional

== History ==
On the San Lorenzo River just north of the present-day municipal seat of Eldorado is the site of Navito, which was inhabited by the Sabaibo and Tahue peoples in pre-Hispanic times. The Spanish expedition of Nuño de Guzmán reached Navito in 1531 and founded the settlement of San Miguel nearby, although they soon moved their settlement to present-day Culiacán.

In 1856, Joaquín Redo y Balmaceda and his wife Alejandra de la Vega acquired lands around Navito, where they built a textile factory named El Coloso and a sugar mill named La Aurora. In 1900, the Redo family built a new sugar mill named Eldorado, which gave its name to the surrounding settlement. In 1917, Eldorado became a sindicatura or municipal subdivision of Culiacán. The writer Inés Arredondo spent her childhood summers in Eldorado.

The idea of establishing an independent municipality of Eldorado first appeared in the 1970s, but various attempts to achieve this had failed before the movement was rekindled in 2020. Finally, on 5 March 2021, the Sinaloa state congress approved the elevation of the sindicatura of Eldorado in the municipality of Culiacán to an independent municipality. The decree establishing the municipality went into force on 23 March 2021.

== Administration ==
Eldorado held its first elections as an independent municipality in 2024. The municipal government of Eldorado consists of a municipal president, a councillor (Spanish: síndico), and six trustees (regidores), three elected by relative majority and three by proportional representation. Eldorado is administratively subdivided into four sindicaturas respectively headquartered at the localities of Eldorado, Leopoldo Sánchez Celis, Las Arenitas, and Guadalupe Victoria.

== Demographics ==
In the 2020 INEGI census, the localities that now comprise the municipality of Eldorado recorded a population of 46,628 inhabitants. The municipal seat, also named Eldorado, recorded a population of 14,772 inhabitants in the 2020 Census. The next largest localities in the municipality are Leopoldo Sánchez Celis and Guadalupe Victoria, which recorded populations of 3411 and 2288 respectively in the 2020 Census.

== Economy ==
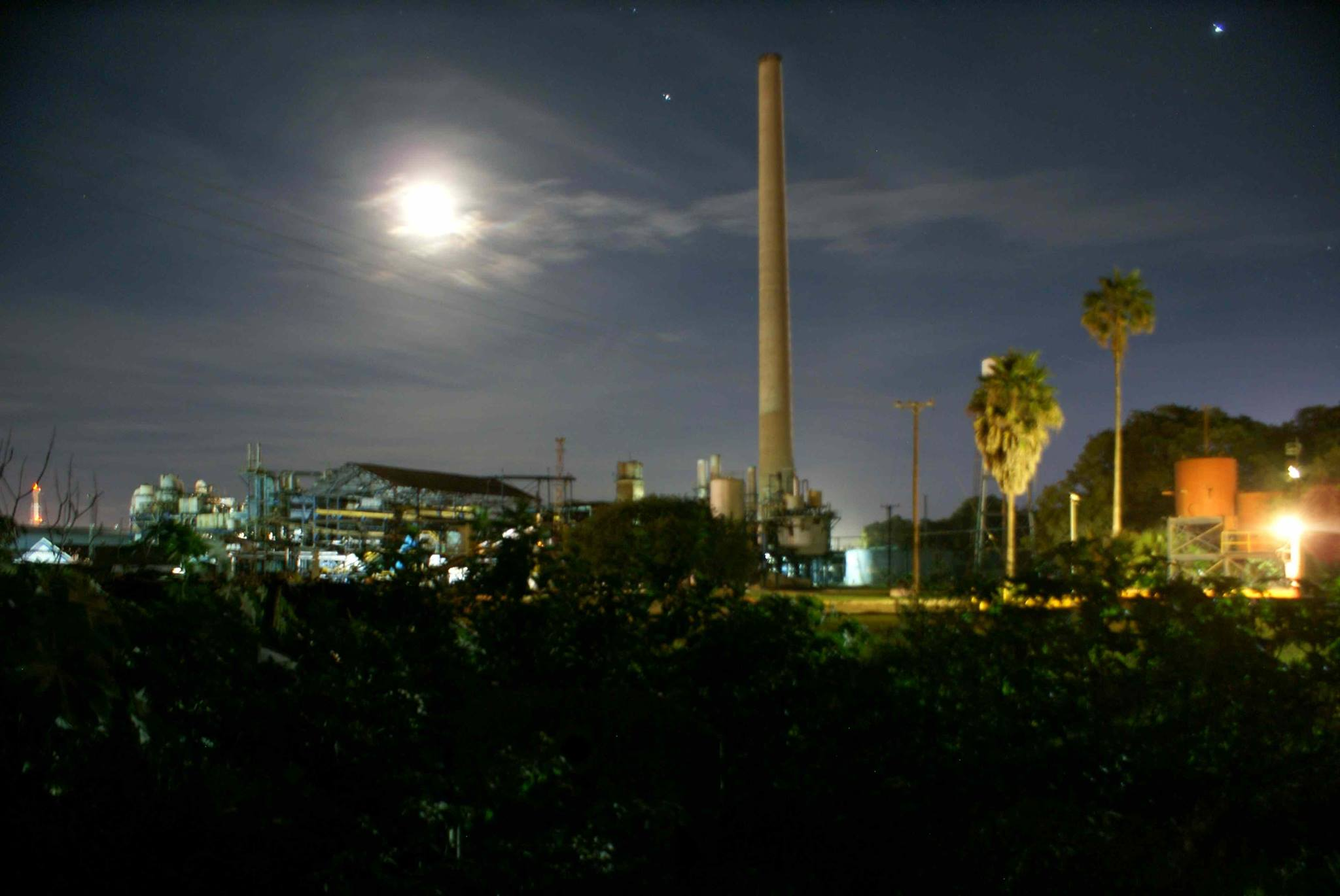
The Eldorado sugar mill.

Eldorado's economy relies on agriculture irrigated by the San Lorenzo River; commerce; and fishing, in particular shrimp farming. Sugar has been cultivated in Eldorado since 1900, and its sugar mill is the only one still operating in Sinaloa today.

Eldorado has several beaches that serve as tourist attractions.
