= Sinaloa Municipality =

Municipality in the Mexican state of Sinaloa

Sinaloa Municipality Municipio de Sinaloa
- Municipality
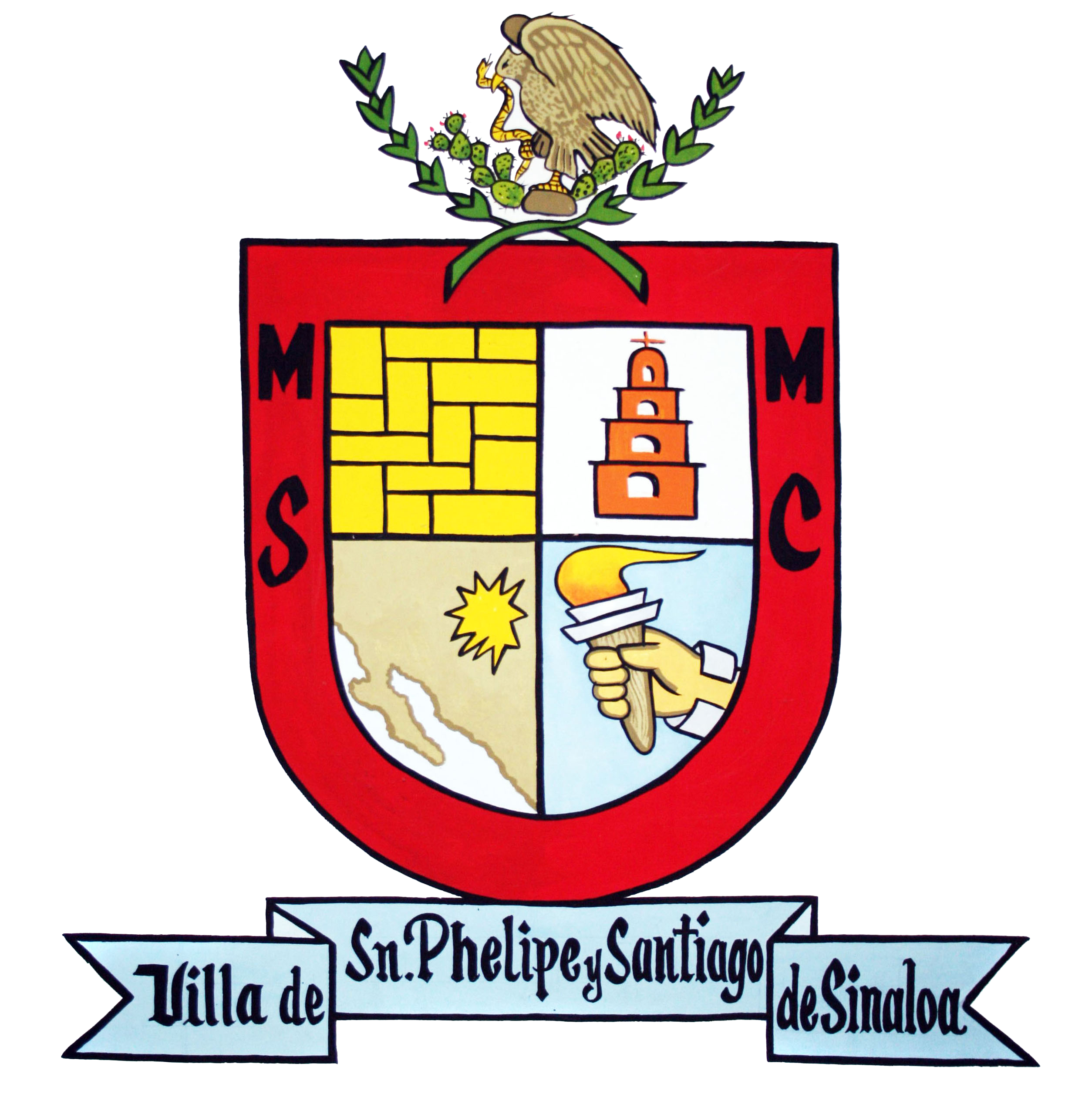
- Coat of arms

- Location of the municipality in Sinaloa
- Coordinates: 25°49′N 108°13′W
- Country: Mexico
- State: Sinaloa
- Seat: Sinaloa de Leyva
- No. of Sindicaturas: 9
- Foundation: 1915

Government
  - Municipal president: Saúl Rubio Valenzuela

Area
  - Total: 6,186.5 km^{2} (2,388.6 sq mi)

Population (2010)
  - Total: 88,282
- Time zone: UTC-7 (Zona Pacífico)
- Website: Official website

Sinaloa is a municipality in the state of Sinaloa in northwestern Mexico. It is the largest municipality in Sinaloa and its seat is Sinaloa de Leyva.

== Political subdivision ==
The municipality of Sinaloa is subdivided in 9 sindicaturas:

- Bacubirito
- Estación Naranjo
- Lázaro Cárdenas (Ejido Ruiz Cortines No. 1)
- Llano Grande
- Maquipo
- Ocoroni
- Palmar de los Sepúlveda
- San José de Gracia
- San José de las Delicias

== Economy ==
Agriculture is one of the three main economic activities in this municipality, with cultivation of maize, beans, soy, wheat, sorghum, tomato and sesame representing the main preferences. Cattle farming is another of the three activities, with 6820 registered cattle farmers, as well as 52235 heads of cattle. In a much more reduced quantity, pigs are reared, as well as domestic birds. The industrial aspect of the economy consists of a furniture factory, as well as a hydroelectric plant belonging to the Federal Electricity Commission (CFE).
