= Choix Municipality =

Municipality in the Mexican state of Sinaloa

Coordinates: 26°42′27″N 108°19′30″W

Choix Municipality Municipio de Choix
- Municipality
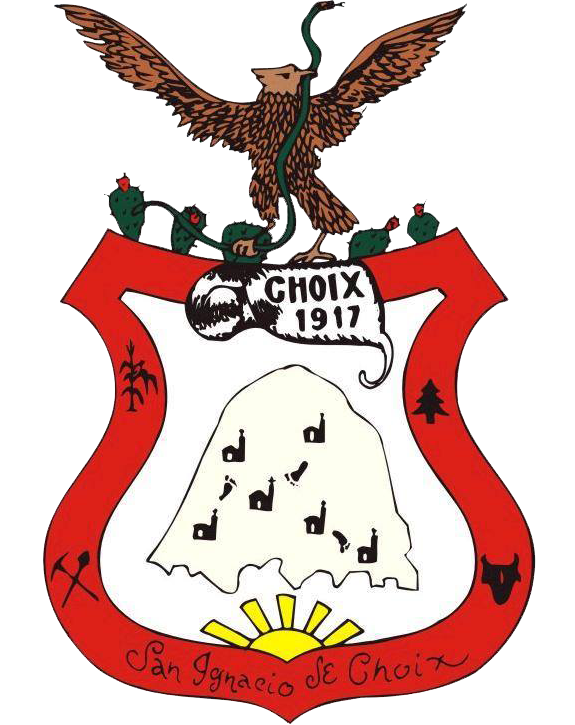
- Coat of arms

- Location of the municipality in Sinaloa
- Country: Mexico
- State: Sinaloa
- Seat: Choix
- No. of Sindicaturas: 8
- Foundation: 1607

Government
  - Municipal president: Yoni Gámez

Area
  - Total: 4,512.40 km^{2} (1,742.25 sq mi)

Population (2010)
  - Total: 32,998
- Time zone: UTC-7 (Mountain Standard Time)
- Website: Choix Government page

The Municipality of Choix is a municipality in the Mexican state of Sinaloa in northwestern Mexico, being the northernmost municipality in Sinaloa. Its seat is Choix.

== Political subdivision ==
Choix Municipality is subdivided in 8 sindicaturas:

- Aguacaliente Grande
- Baca
- Bacayopa
- Baymena
- Los Pozos
- Picachos
- San Javier
- Yecorato
