= El Fuerte Municipality =

Municipality in the Mexican state of Sinaloa

Coordinates: 25°53′N 108°16′W

El Fuerte Municipality Municipio de El Fuerte
- Municipality
- Fuerte River bridge

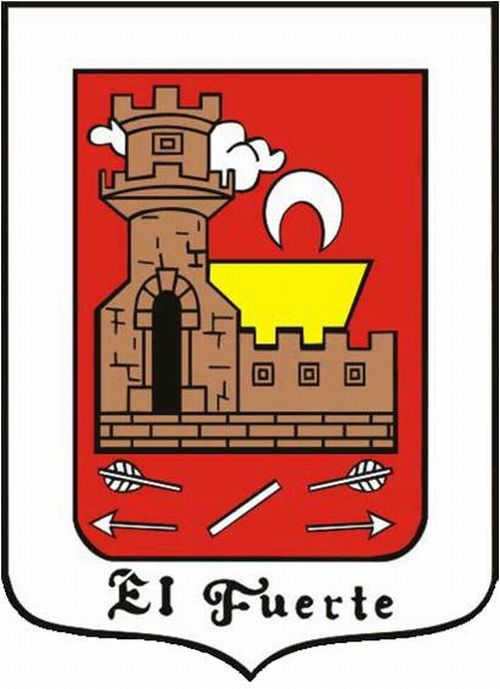
- Coat of arms

- Location of the municipality in Sinaloa
- Country: Mexico
- State: Sinaloa
- Seat: El Fuerte
- No. of Sindicaturas: 7
- Foundation: 1915

Government
  - Municipal president: Gildardo Leyva Ortega

Area
  - Total: 384,302 km^{2} (148,380 sq mi)

Population (2010)
  - Total: 97,536
- Time zone: UTC-7 (Mountain Standard Time)
- Website: El Fuerte Government page

El Fuerte is a municipality in the Mexican state of Sinaloa in northwestern Mexico. Its seat is El Fuerte city.

== Political subdivision ==
El Fuerte Municipality is subdivided in 7 sindicaturas:

- Mochicahui
- Charay
- San Blas
- Tehueco
- Tetaroba
- Chinobampo
- Jahuara II
