= La Brecha, Sinaloa =

La Brecha is a town in the Mexican state of Sinaloa. It stands at 25°22′16″N 108°25′09″W. It is part of Guasave Municipality.

Population (2010): 2,075
