= Ahome =

Municipality in the Mexican state of Sinaloa

Ahome Municipality Municipio de Ahome
- Municipality
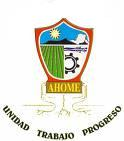
- Coat of arms

- Location of the municipality in Sinaloa
- Country: Mexico
- State: Sinaloa
- Seat: Los Mochis
- No. of Sindicaturas: 7
- Foundation: 1917

Government
  - Municipal president: Manuel Guillermo Moreno

Area
  - Total: 4,342.89 km^{2} (1,676.80 sq mi)

Population (2010)
  - Total: 416,299
  - Density: 95.8576/km^{2} (248.270/sq mi)
- Time zone: UTC–07:00 (Zona Pacífico)
- Area code: +52 668
- Website: Ahome government page

Ahome (Spanish pronunciation: [aˈome]) is a municipality on the coast of the Gulf of California in the northwestern part of the Mexican state of Sinaloa, being the westernmost municipality in Sinaloa; it is adjacent to the southern border of Sonora state. It reported 388,344 inhabitants in the 2005 census. Ahome (population 10,840) is also the name of the second-largest community in the municipality. The municipal seat is the port city of Los Mochis, its largest community. It is a commercial corridor to the northwest of the country. It is situated on the Pacific coastal plain, at the entrance of the Gulf of California and lies in the heart of a rich agricultural region, Fort Valley. It stands at .

== Major communities ==
- Los Mochis (Municipal seat)
- Ahome
- Higuera de Zaragoza
- Topolobampo
- San Miguel Zapotitlán

== Political subdivision ==
Ahome Municipality is subdivided in 7 sindicaturas:

- Central-Mochis
- Topolobampo
- Ahome
- Higuera de Zaragoza
- El Guayabo
- San Miguel
- El Carrizo

== History ==
- 1605 - Jesuit missionaries led by Andrés Pérez de Ribas found Mission Santa María Ahome
- 1851 - Year of cholera, when the disease claims numerous lives in the region.
- 1880 - Installation of a sugar refinery, a fundamental pillar of the future city.
- 1901 - Opening of the Kansas City Mexico & Oriente Railway company in Topolobampo.
- 1903 - Foundation of Los Mochis.
- 1904 - Creation of the town of Ahome la Junta Separatista (Separatist Committee), which seeks separation from the municipality of El Fuerte (the Fort) and the creation of Ahome.
- 1914 - Felipe Bachomo takes la Villa de Ahome (Village of Ahome) by violent force.
- 1917 - La Villa de Ahome is designated municipal seat of the new municipality.
- 1935 - The city council changes the municipal seat to Los Mochis.

== Municipal presidents ==
- 1948 - 1950: Francisco Ceballos - One of the best municipal presidents due to his contributions to the municipality, including the highway between Los Mochis and Ahome and between Los Mochis and Topolobampo
- 1951 - 1953: Samuel C. Castro
- 1954 - 1956: Armando Guerrero
- 1947 - 1959: Miguel León López
- 1960 - 1962: Antonio López Bojórquez
- 1963 - 1965: Alfonso Calderón Velarde
- 1966 - 1968: Canuto Ibarra Guerrero
- 1969 - 1971: Ernesto Ortegón
- 1972 - 1974: Nicanor Villareal
- 1975 - 1977: Oscar Monzón
- 1978 - 1980: Oscar Aguilar Pereira
- 1981 - 1983: Jaime Ibarra
- 1984 - 1986: Felipe Moreno Rosales
- 1987 - 1989: Ernesto Álvarez Nolasco
- 1990 - 1992: Ramón Ignacio Rodrigo Castro
- 1993 - 1995: Federico Careaga
- 1996 - 1998: Francisco López Brito
- 1999 - 2001: Esteban Valenzuela García
- 2002 - 2004: Mario López Valdez
- 2005 - 2007: Policarpo Infante Fierro
- 2008 - 2010: Esteban Valenzuela García

== Geography ==
=== Climate ===
The climate is mildly hot and humid, hardly modified by rainfall. Studies have established the average annual temperature to be 33 °C (91.4 °F). In the last twenty-eight years, the lowest recorded temperature was 5 °C (41 °F) and the highest was 43 °C (109.4 °F), the hottest months being from July to October and the coolest from November to February. In the period of reference, rainfall averaged 302.2 mm (11.9 inches) annually, with the rainiest months being from July to October. The prevailing winds in the region are oriented in a southwesterly direction with an approximate speed of one meter per second (2.23 mph). Relative humidity averages between 65 and 75%.

== See also ==
25°33′50″N 108°46′00″W
