= Seat (legal entity) =

Organization's center of authority

In legal English and in rules applicable elsewhere, the seat of an organisation is the centre of authority.

== Commercial ==
The seat of a corporation is the publicly-registered headquarters, or the registered office of a corporate entity. Also referred to as the siège réel, or head office, it is the legal centre of operations and the locale that generally determines the laws that bind the corporation.

Austrian nationally-based seat requirements for architects and engineers were criticised by the European Commission in 2016, as the Commission believed the requirements were not consistent with the EU's Services Directive of 2006.

== Government ==
A seat is a competitive position of trust, or public trust, within a government that is normally filled by election. The politician represents a constituency of citizens and may hold the seat for a limited term after which the electorate votes once again to fill the seat.

When the politician gains authority, the politician is said to be seated. During the politician's term, the politician considered to be the sitting trust of that seat. For example, from 2017 to 2021, the sitting President of the Australian Senate was Scott Ryan. An incumbent politician who fails to win an election or is removed from office is said to be unseated.

== See also ==
- Elections
- Siège social
