= Ariel Camacho =

Mexican musician (1992–2015)

- Camacho c. 2014

Background information
- Also known as: La Tuyía; El Rey de Corazones; El Mentado; El Rey del Requinto
- Born: José Ariel Camacho El Rey; July 8, 1992; Guamúchil, Sinaloa, Mexico
- Died: February 25, 2015 (aged 22) Angostura, Sinaloa, Mexico
- Genres: Regional Mexican; sierreño with tuba; corrido; narcocorrido
- Occupations: Musician; singer; songwriter
- Instruments: Vocals; Guitar
- Years active: 2009–2015
- Label: JG MUSIC (2013–2014) DEL Records (2014–2015)
- Formerly of: Los Plebes del Rancho

José Ariel Camacho Barraza (July 8, 1992 – February 25, 2015) was a Mexican musician and singer-songwriter. He predominantly performed regional Mexican music, mainly corridos. He was the lead singer and lead guitarist of his group, Ariel Camacho y Los Plebes del Rancho. In 2013, Ariel Camacho y Los Plebes del Rancho signed to JG Records where they frequently played in Tijuana, Baja California, Mexico. In 2014 they signed with DEL Records, which allowed them to play their music in the United States.

== Early life ==
Camacho was born to Benito Camacho and Reynalda Barraza on July 8, 1992, in Guamúchil, Sinaloa. By age seven, he began playing the guitar and singing by age 12. He became known as "La Tuyía" (Note: A nickname meaning "you've made that guitar yours".) due to a childhood nickname given to him by his grandfather because his guitar was much bigger than him. When he was in middle school, he met César Iván Sánchez, who would later play guitar and do backup vocals for his band.

== Career ==
Camacho later sought to expand his group and found a tuba player, Omar Burgos. His first concert was held in Tijuana, in which he played for more than 40,000 people. He quickly became known for his expressive way of playing the Mexican twelve-string guitar, a modification of common twelve-string guitars to approximate the timbre of the bajo sexto. Ariel's preferred brand of guitar was the Takamine. He would play a P3DC-12 guitar.

He decided to form a band in the beginning of 2013. His band Ariel Camacho y Los Plebes del Rancho consisted of "el Tigre", Cesar Sánchez who did rhythm guitar and backing vocals, and "el Cenizo" Omar Burgos who played the sousaphone tuba. Camacho was the lead singer and played lead guitar in the band. His band quickly became known due to their outdated combination of standard guitar, twelve-string guitar, and sousaphone tuba. Among their most successful songs were "Hablemos", "Te Metiste", "El Karma" and "Rey de Corazónes". He was later nicknamed "El Rey de Corazónes" after releasing the same-titled song, that quickly made his group known through social media. Camacho was praised for maintaining a classical element in his regional music by paying attention to the songwriters who had come before him such as Miguel y Miguel, Camacho's favorite artists. He was also a frequent collaborator with other corrido singers, including Grupo Fernández, Grupo Marca Registrada, Los Traviezoz de la Zierra, and Regulo Caro.

== Death ==
On 25 February 2015, Camacho and four other people were in a car accident on the road from Angostura, Sinaloa. Camacho was returning from a music festival, Carnaval de Mocorito. Camacho and two others died and two other people were injured. They were riding in a 2004 Honda Accord when Camacho lost control. The accident reportedly occurred at two in the morning on highway Angostura–La Reforma. Camacho died on impact. It is unclear whether he was driving intoxicated although it was reported he was driving at excessive speed. He died at the age of 22.

== Legacy ==
Following his death, his group's song "El Karma" reached number one on the Billboard Hot Latin Songs chart in March and the album hit the top five of the Latin albums chart. Shortly after his death, Ariel Camacho y Los Plebes del Rancho changed their name to Los Plebes del Rancho de Ariel Camacho to tribute Camacho. The band continues to make albums in honor of Camacho, like "Recuerden Mi Estilo", alongside Camacho's father, Benito Camacho. Many have paid tribute to Camacho through the use of songs such as Virlán García with "Hasta el Cielo", Los Traviezoz de la Zierra with "Mis Últimos Momentos" and "Un Mentado Ariel". An album in tribute to Camacho was also released in 2017 called "Ariel Camacho Para Siempre" that features artists such as Gerardo Ortiz, Regulo Caro, and Revolver Cannabis. Each year on 25 February in memory of Camacho, his band, family members, fans, and other artists come together at his grave to commemorate him. Ariel is now known by many as "el Rey del Requinto", "el Mentado", "el Rey de Corazones" and "la Tuyía".

Many later artists making regional Mexican music including in the corridos tumbados scene cite Camacho as a source of inspiration, some of these artists include Natanael Cano, Junior H, Gabito Ballesteros, among several others.

== Discography ==
- El Karma (2014)
- Hablemos (2015)
