= Rolando Bojórquez Gutiérrez =

Mexican politician

- Born: 12 August 1967; Angostura, Sinaloa, Mexico
- Died: 8 March 2013 (aged 45); Culiacán, Sinaloa, Mexico
- Occupation: Politician
- Political party: PRI

Rolando Bojórquez Gutiérrez (12 August 1967 – 8 March 2013) was a Mexican politician from the Institutional Revolutionary Party.

Bojórquez Gutiérrez was born in Angostura, Sinaloa, in 1967. From 2008 to 2009 he served as municipal president of Angostura. In the 2009 mid-terms he was elected to the Chamber of Deputies to represent Sinaloa's 3rd district during the 61st session of Congress.

He died in Culiacán on 8 March 2013.
