= 3rd federal electoral district of Sinaloa =

Federal electoral district of Mexico

Sinaloa's 3rd
- Electoral district of the Chamber of Deputies of Mexico

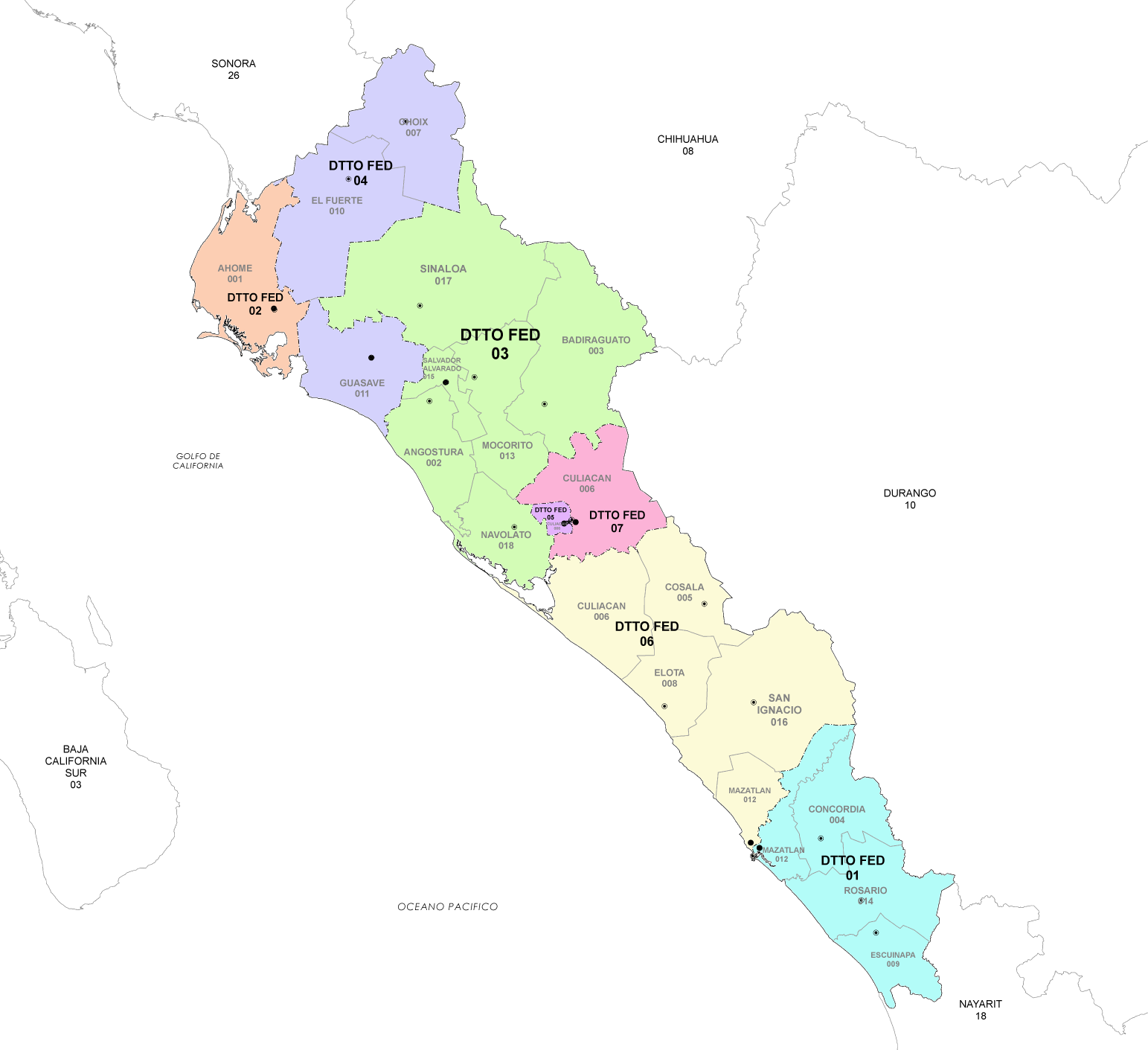
- 3rd district since 2023

Incumbent
- Member: Jesús Fernando García
- Party: ▌Morena
- Congress: 66th (2024–2027)

District
- State: Sinaloa
- Head town: Guamúchil
- Coordinates: 25°27′N 108°4′W
- Covers: Angostura, Badiraguato, Mocorito, Navolato, Salvador Alvarado, Sinaloa
- PR region: First
- Precincts: 773
- Population: 415,710 (2020 census)

The 3rd federal electoral district of Sinaloa (Spanish: Distrito electoral federal 03 de Sinaloa) is one of the 300 electoral districts into which Mexico is divided for elections to the federal Chamber of Deputies and one of seven such districts in the state of Sinaloa.

It elects one deputy to the lower house of Congress for each three-year legislative session by means of the first-past-the-post system. Votes cast in the district also count towards the calculation of proportional representation ("plurinominal") deputies elected from the first region.

The current member for the district, re-elected in the 2024 general election, is Jesús Fernando García Hernández of the National Regeneration Movement (Morena).

== District territory ==
Under the 2023 districting plan adopted by the National Electoral Institute (INE), which is to be used for the 2024, 2027 and 2030 federal elections, the third district is located in the north-central region of the state and covers 773 electoral precincts (secciones electorales) across six municipalities:

- Angostura, Badiraguato, Mocorito, Navolato, Salvador Alvarado and Sinaloa.

The head town (cabecera distrital), where results from individual polling stations are gathered together and tallied, is the city of Guamúchil, the municipal seat of Salvador Alvarado. The district reported a population of 415,710 in the 2020 census.

== Previous districting schemes ==
Evolution of electoral district numbers
	1974	1978	1996	2005	2017	2023
Sinaloa	5	9	8	8	7	7
Chamber of Deputies	196	300				

2017–2022

The municipalities of Angostura, Badiraguato, Mocorito, Navolato, Salvador Alvarado and Sinaloa, as under the 2023 plan. The head town was at Guamúchil.

2005–2017

The municipalities of Angostura, Navolato and Salvador Alvarado in their entirety, plus 82 precincts in the municipality of Culiacán. (Note: In the 2005–2017 plan, the 5th and 7th districts covered the remainder of Culiacán.) The head town was at Guamúchil.

1996–2005

The municipalities of Angostura, Badiraguato, Mocorito and Navolato, with the head town at the city of Navolato.

1978–1996

The districting scheme in force from 1978 to 1996 was the result of the 1977 electoral reforms, which increased the number of single-member seats in the Chamber of Deputies from 196 to 300. Under that plan, Sinaloa's seat allocation rose from five to nine. The 3rd district comprised a portion of the state capital, the city of Culiacán. (Note: In the 1978–1996 plan, the 8th and 9th districts covered the remainder of Culiacán.)

== Deputies returned to Congress ==
(Mexico) National parties
- Current
- PAN
- PRI
- PT
- PVEM
- MC
- Morena
- PAZ
- Somos
- Defunct or local only
- PLM
- PNR
- PRM
- PNM
- PP
- PPS
- PARM
- PFCRN
- CON
- PANAL
- PSD
- PES
- PES
- PRD

Sinaloa's 3rd district
Election	Deputy	Party	Term	Legislature
1916	Carlos M. Esquerro		1916–1917	Constituent Congress of Querétaro
...
1970	Renato Vega Alvarado	Institutional Revolutionary Party	1970–1973	48th Congress
1973	Fernando Uriarte Hernández	Institutional Revolutionary Party	1973–1976	49th Congress
1976	Gil Rafael Oceguera Ramos	Institutional Revolutionary Party	1976–1979	50th Congress
1979	Jesús Enrique Hernández Chávez	Institutional Revolutionary Party	1979–1982	51st Congress
1982	Jesús Manuel Viedas Esquerra	Institutional Revolutionary Party	1982–1985	52nd Congress
1985	Mario Niebla Álvarez	Institutional Revolutionary Party	1985–1988	53rd Congress
1988	Jorge del Rincón Bernal	National Action Party (Mexico)	1988–1991	54th Congress
1991	Humberto Gómez Campaña	Institutional Revolutionary Party	1991–1994	55th Congress
1994	Jorge Kondo López (Note: Kondo López resigned his seat on 10 October 1995 and was replaced by his alternate, Ponce Duarte.); Limbert Oswaldo Ponce Duarte	Institutional Revolutionary Party	1994–1995; 1995–1997	56th Congress
1997	Alfredo Villegas Arreola	Institutional Revolutionary Party	1997–2000	57th Congress
2000	Martha Ofelia Meza Escalante	Institutional Revolutionary Party	2000–2003	58th Congress
2003	Abraham Velázquez Iribe (Note: Velázquez Iribe resigned his seat on 1 August 2004 and was replaced by his alternate, Valenzuela Rodelo.); Rosa Hilda Valenzuela Rodelo	Institutional Revolutionary Party	2003–2004; 2004–2006	59th Congress
2006	Gilberto Ojeda Camacho	Institutional Revolutionary Party	2006–2009	60th Congress
2009	Rolando Bojórquez Gutiérrez	Institutional Revolutionary Party	2009–2012	61st Congress
2012	Alfonso Inzunza Montoya	Institutional Revolutionary Party	2012–2015	62nd Congress
2015	Evelio Plata Inzunza	Institutional Revolutionary Party	2015–2018	63rd Congress
2018	Jesús Fernando García Hernández	Labour Party (Mexico)	2018–2021	64th Congress
2021	Jesús Fernando García Hernández	Labour Party (Mexico)	2021–2024	65th Congress
2024	Jesús Fernando García Hernández	National Regeneration Movement	2024–2027	66th Congress

== Presidential elections ==
Sinaloa's 3rd district
Election	District won by	Party or coalition	%
2018	Andrés Manuel López Obrador	Juntos Haremos Historia	59.2227
2024	Claudia Sheinbaum Pardo	Sigamos Haciendo Historia	66.4350
