= Mexican twelve-string guitar =

Type of guitar

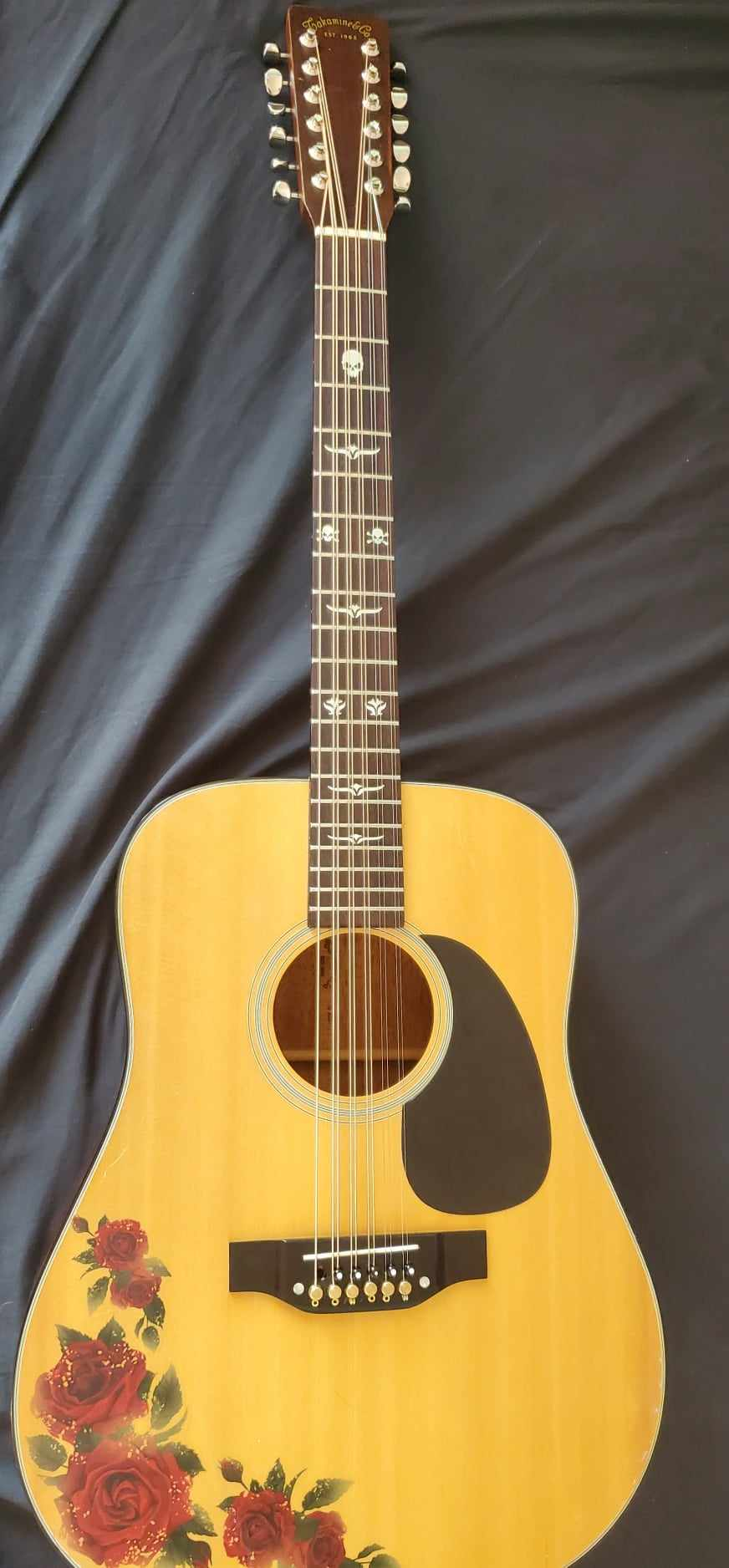
A vintage Takamine 12-string with a requinto style set-up

The Mexican twelve-string guitar, also known as a requinto-style or Sierreño-style guitar, is a modified twelve-string guitar. It can approximate the sound of a bajo sexto or bajo quinto and play regional Mexican styles, such as norteño, Tejano (Tex-Mex), and conjunto (música mexicana-tejana). In a traditional 12-string setup, the lower four strings (E, A, D, and G) have octave pairs, while the top two (B and E) have unison pairs. However, for Regional Mexican styles, all strings are set up with identical unison pairs instead of the traditional octave courses. This configuration yields a resonant timbre reminiscent of the venerable bajo sexto, but adds significantly more tension on the bridge and neck. Furthermore, it usually requires the nut to be modified, the neck compensated, and the bridge to be reinforced.

== Modifications ==
Requinto-style setups for 12-string guitars represent an approach to instrument customization derived from the traditions of the bajo sexto and quinto in Mexican music. The scarcity of dedicated luthiers specializing in bajo sexto and quinto instruments necessitated the creation of the requinto-style 12-string guitar.

In contrast to traditional 12-string counterparts, characterized by a configuration of six pairs of strings, most tuned an octave apart, requinto-style setups feature two sets of six strings. This configuration yields a resonant timbre reminiscent of the venerable bajo sexto. The Bajo Sexto (or Quinto) & Mexican 12 string Guitar can both be played together so that the Bajo Sexto provides the Low End while the Mexican 12 string Guitar provides the High End.

It is worth noting that the traditional bajo sexto, engineered to endure high tension, differs markedly from the smaller and more modest physique of modern 12-string guitars, potentially ill-suited to such demands. To mitigate this excess tension, musicians employ various strategies, including:

- String Gauges: Using the lightest possible string gauges to minimize tension (e.g. Magma Ultra-Light Strings, 9, 11, 16, 26, 36, 46).
- 11 String set-up: Often utilizing a single E-string instead of the conventional two.
- Detuning and Capos: Employing detuning methods, either with or without capos on the first or second fret, to achieve open strings in the standard key.
- Bridge Reinforcements: Installing pressure posts, such as the JDL Bridge Doctor, beneath the bridge to prevent structural issues like bridge detachment, neck snapping, or belly warping or using a tailpiece. These pressure posts can be either screw-mounted or installed with brass pins, allowing horizontal string mounting, with the latter being recommended.

Customizing the guitar on one's own is a common occurrence, and often results in visual representations of Mexican culture and tradition. Contemporary customizations include wrapping the guitar in a fashion reminiscent of automobile aesthetics, altering pickguards, fitting specialized soundhole pick-ups, and adorning the instrument with artistic embellishments.

== In popular culture ==
Popular guitar manufacturers of 12-strings, including Takamine Guitars, Fender Guitars, C. F. Martin & Company, and Ibanez, have emerged as favored canvases for crafting requinto-style instruments. The most popular option by far is Takamine, with its Takamine Signature artist model for John Jorgenson, commonly referred to as "el JJ" by players, being one of the most sought-after models. In an interview with Takamine, Jorgenson learned the factory in Japan "couldn't build them fast enough" as they were constantly selling out. An iconic Regional Mexican style guitarist named Ariel Camacho used his signature 12-string with a requinto style set-up before he died young and many players favor his model in particular.

Artists today have turned Norteño into a popular urban style, though it recently became very notable in mainstream media, not limiting itself to listeners of Mexican heritage. More recently, Peso Pluma made history at the 2023 VMAs as the first Regional Mexican genre artist to perform in the show's history. His band consisted of two guitarists, one of them playing a Mexican 12-String.

The Company H Jimenez makes an instrument called the "Guitarra Doble" (Taylor makes a 657ce Doce Doble) which is a 12 string Guitar that's made to be strung w/ 2 sets of Extra Light Gauge (or Thinner) Strings from the ground up.

== Notable players ==
- Ariel Camacho
- Peso Pluma
- DannyLux
- Miguel Montoya
- Nitro De Oro

== See also ==
- Guitarra séptima
