= Los Plebes del Rancho de Ariel Camacho =

Regional Mexican band

Los Plebes Del Rancho de Ariel Camacho
- Also known as: Ariel Camacho y Los Plebes del Rancho (2013-2015)
- Origin: Angostura, Sinaloa, Mexico
- Genres: Sierreño-banda
- Years active: 2013-Present
- Labels: JG Music, DEL Records Music/Entertainment
- Members: Orlando Valdez; César Sánchez; Israel Meza
- Past members: Ariel Camacho; Omar Burgos; José Manuel López Castro; Johnny Cortés
- Website: https://www.facebook.com/JGMusicOficial/

Los Plebes del Rancho de Ariel Camacho are a regional Mexican band, specializing in the sierreño-banda style (also known as sierreño with tuba). The group was founded in 2013 as Ariel Camacho y Los Plebes del Rancho, by Mexican musician Ariel Camacho and his friend César Sánchez and were originally signed to JG Entertainment. They signed with DEL Records in 2014, but then left in 2016 due to disputes with the label's owner. The death of Ariel Camacho caused changes to the group.

The band consists of a twelve-string guitar, a six-string acoustic guitar, and a sousaphone tuba. This style of regional Mexican music is a hybrid of Sinaloa-style sierreño and banda.

Los Plebes del Rancho are credited with turning their style of music, which had previously been an obscure genre from the sierras (mountain ranges) of Northwestern Mexico, into a mainstream genre popular across Mexico and the Mexican-American community of the United States.

== History ==
The group was founded in 2013, by Ariel Camacho and his friend César Sánchez. The group would continue releasing music in 2014, during this time their songs would popularize the sierreño genre. In 2015, Ariel Camacho died in a car accident. José Manuel López Castro later became the band's new lead vocalist and twelve-string guitarist.

In early 2016, a legal battle with their label, DEL Records, ensued as both the company and the band claimed to be the owners of the name "Los Plebes del Rancho". In the end, the band was split in two: José Manuel López Castro and César Sánchez left DEL Records and continued to record as Los Plebes del Rancho, while their original sousaphone player, Omar Burgos, sided with DEL Records and was recruited to be part of a new sierreño-banda band promoted by the label: Ulises Chaidez y sus Plebes. Los Plebes del Rancho recruited Israel Meza as their new sousaphone player.

Their songs "Por Enamorarme” (2016) and "Será Que Estoy Enamorado" (2017) have topped the Mexican airplay charts. José Manuel López Castro left the band in September 2018, being replaced by Johnny Cortés.

In March 2024, Los Plebes del Rancho were joined by another vocalist and guitarist, Orlando Valdez. In September 2024, Johnny Cortés left the band; leaving Orlando Valdez as the sole lead vocalist and twelve-string guitarist.

== Discography ==
=== Studio albums ===
List of studio albums, with selected details, chart positions
Title	Album details	Peak chart positions			Certifications
Title	Album details	MEX	US	US Latin	Certifications
El Karma	Release date: September 23, 2014; Label: DEL Records; Format: CD, digital download	1	—	4	RIAA: Gold (Latin)
Hablemos	Release date: November 6, 2015; Label: DEL Records; Format: CD, digital download	1	—	2	
Recuerden Mi Estilo	Release date: March 4, 2016; Label: DEL Records; Format: CD, digital download	1	174	1	
Ariel Camacho Para Siempre (Note: also credited as Para Siempre: Duetos, Vol. 1)	Release date: February 24, 2017; Label: DEL Records; Format: CD, digital download	1	—	6	
La Suerte	Release date: April 14, 2017; Label: JG Music; Format: CD, digital download	9	—	20	
En Vivo con Banda Sinaloense La Tuyia de Culiacán, Sinaloa	Release date: April 19, 2019; Label: JG Music; Format: CD, digital download	—	—	—	
