= Sierreño =

Subgenre of regional Mexican music

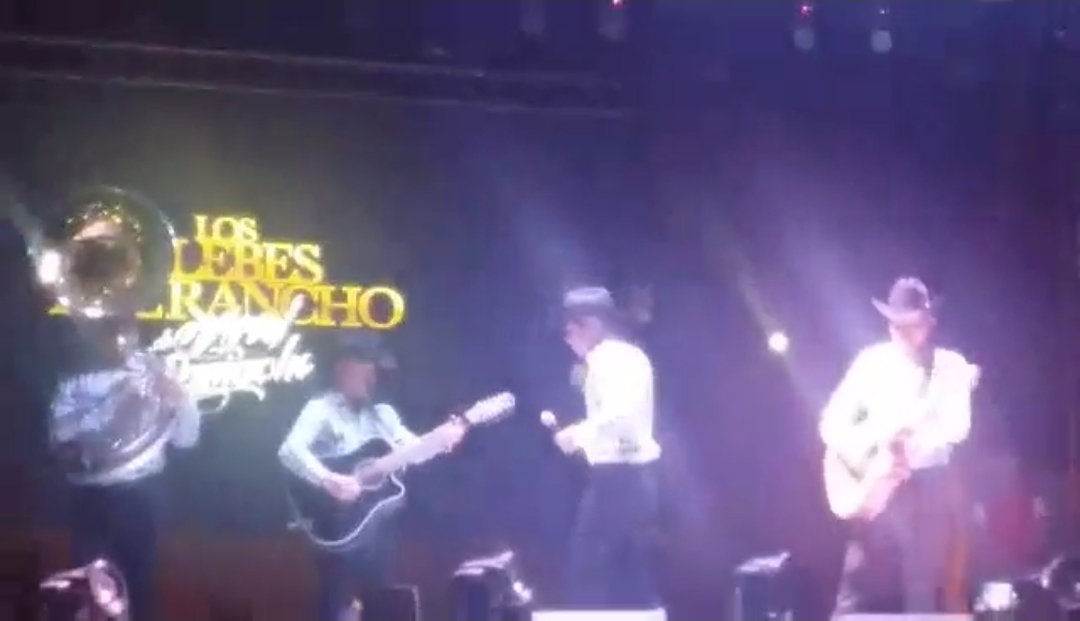
- Sierreño group Los Plebes del Rancho de Ariel Camacho
- Stylistic origins: Ranchera; corrido; norteño; huapango; Indigenous music of Mexico
- Cultural origins: Late 20th Century, Northwestern Mexico

Subgenres
- Sierreño guerrerense, Sierreño sinaloense, Sad sierreño, Pop-rock sierreño, Tumbado/Urban sierreño

Regional scenes
- Mexico, United States

Other topics
- New Mexico music; Tejano music; Regional Mexican music

Sierreño or sierreña, is a subgenre of regional Mexican music. It is derived from Norteño music and is based on melodic lines along with the composition of mainly guitar and sometimes accordion.

The genre is widely popular in Mexico and in Mexican-American communities in the United States. The genre experienced a rise in popularity among Generation Z. The repertoire of sierreño groups is different in tradition than that of norteño groups; it includes rancheras and corridos, also adaptations of ballads and almost all genres of Latin American music.

The instruments most widely used in sierreño music include the twelve-string guitar, acoustic guitar, and electric bass. Less common instruments include the button accordion, acoustic bass, tololoche, sousaphone, tenor horn, trombone, and alto saxophone.

== History ==
Sierreño is believed to have originated from the highlands of northwestern states of Mexico (Sinaloa, Sonora, Chihuahua and Durango).

Mexican singer-songwriter Ariel Camacho led the sierreño style with Los Plebes del Rancho in 2014. Camacho would go on to inspire many other later regional Mexican artists like Junior H and Iván Cornejo. These artists sang a style of sierreño known as sad sierreño, with lyrics that focus on heartbreak and love. Sierreño became popular among members of Generation Z, with the popularity of sad sierreño (or emo sierreño) and urban sierreño.

Other artists who perform sierreño music include Los Cuates de Sinaloa, Gerardo Ortíz, Regulo Caro, El Fantasma, Carín León, Luis R. Conriquez, Fuerza Regida, Herencia de Patrones, Eslabón Armado, Natanael Cano, Peso Pluma, Gabito Ballesteros, Xavi, DannyLux, Yahritza y su Esencia, Grupo Firme, Los Hijos de Barrón, Alta Consigna, Crecer Germán, Ulices Chaidez, Los Perdidos de Sinaloa, Jovanny Cadena y su Estilo Privado, Virlán García, Marca MP, Abraham Vázquez, Tercer Elemento, Los Dareyes de la Sierra, Los Alameños de la Sierra, and Los Alegres de la Sierra.
