= Rodelo =

Rodelo may refer to:

- Rosa Valenzuela Rodelo, Mexican politician
- Kid Rodelo, 1966 film

== See also ==
- Rodello
