= Inzunza =

Inzunza is a surname. Notable people with the surname include:

- Alfonso Inzunza Montoya (b. 1949), Mexican politician
- Enrique Inzunza (b. 1972), Mexican politician
- Gonzalo Inzunza Inzunza (1971–2013), Mexican drug lord
- Ralph Inzunza (b. 1969), American politician
