= Twelve-string guitar =

Fretted string instrument optimized for richer sounds

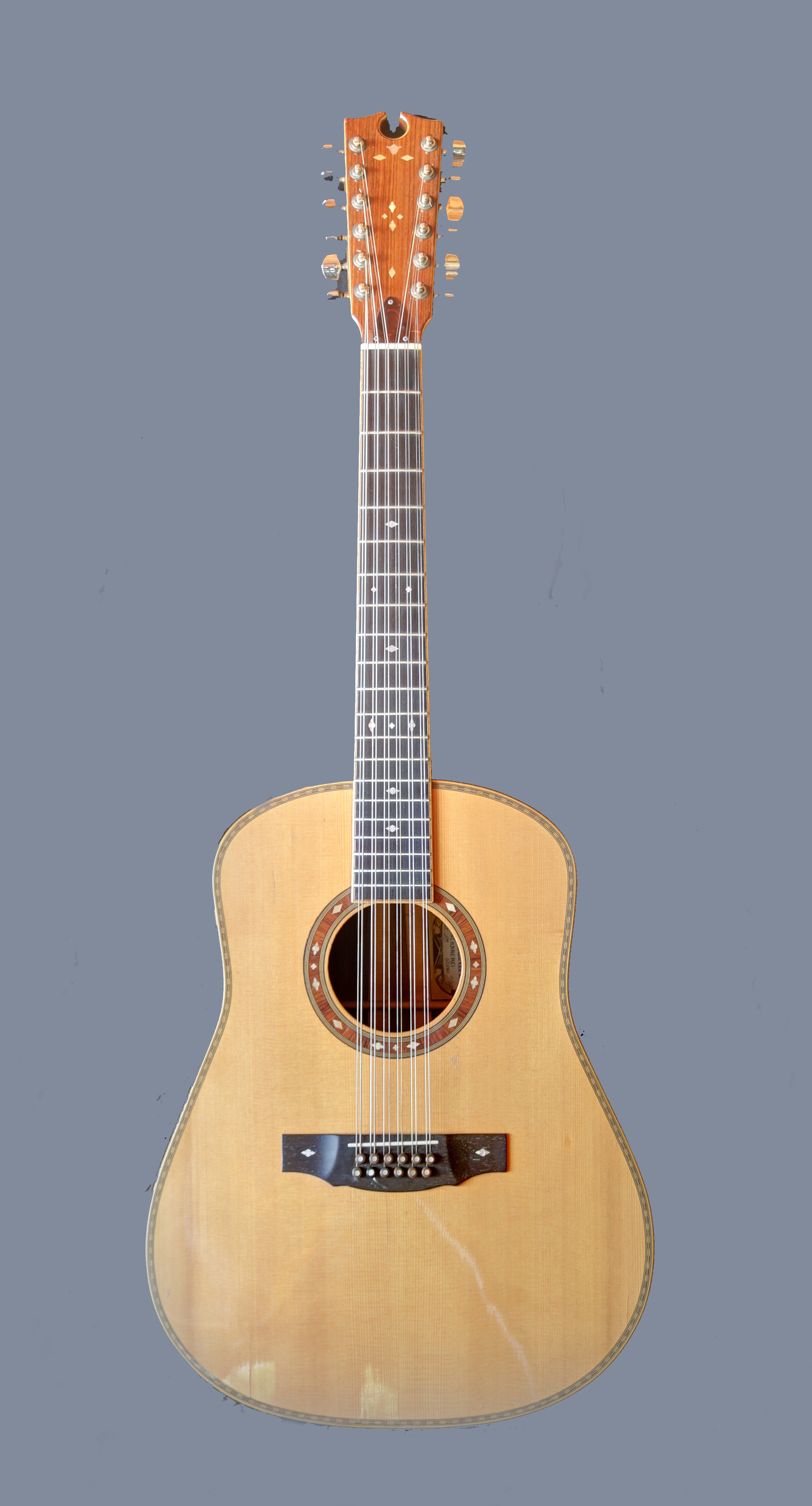
An acoustic 12-string guitar hand-crafted in 1977

A twelve-string guitar is a steel-string guitar with 12 strings in six courses, which produces a thicker, more ringing tone than a standard six-string guitar. Typically, the strings of the lower four courses are tuned in octaves, with those of the upper two courses tuned in unison. The gap between the strings within each dual-string course is narrow, and the strings of each course are fretted and plucked as a single unit. The neck is wider, to accommodate the extra strings, and is similar to the width of a classical guitar neck. The sound, particularly on acoustic instruments, is fuller and more harmonically resonant than six-string instruments. The 12-string guitar can be played like a 6-string guitar as players still use the same notes, chords and guitar techniques like a standard 6-string guitar, but advanced techniques can be challenging as players need to play or pluck two strings simultaneously.

Structurally, 12-string guitars, especially those built before 1970, differ from six-string guitars in the following ways:

- The headstock is elongated to accommodate 12 tuning machines.
- The added tension of the six additional strings necessitates stronger reinforcement of the neck.
- The body is also reinforced, and built with a stronger structure, to withstand the higher tension.
- The fretting scale is generally shorter to reduce the overall string tension.

Twelve-string guitars are made in both acoustic and electric forms. However, the acoustic type is more common.

== "Chorus" effect ==
The double ranks of strings of the 12-string guitar produce a shimmering effect, because even the strings tuned in unison can never vibrate with precise simultaneity—that is, they vibrate out of phase. The result to the ear is a sound that seems to "shimmer", which some describe as resembling strings that are slightly detuned. The interference between the out-of-phase vibrations produces a phenomenon known as a beat that results in a periodic rise and fall of intensity which is, in music, often considered pleasing to the ear. Pete Seeger described the distinctive sound of the 12-string guitar as "the clanging of bells."

== Origin and history ==
The origin of the modern 12-string guitar dates back to the 19th century. The oldest precedent is the Baroque guitar with six double strings (late 18th century), which was an evolution of the Baroque guitar with five double strings, to which a sixth double string of E was added.. This guitar was tuned in the sequence EE-BB-GG-DD-AA-EE, where the last three double strings were octaved (DD-AA-EE). Six-string guitars with double strings continued to be used in Spain in the 19th century, but these followed the classical or romantic guitar model, being the most direct antecedent of the current 12-string guitar. Related instruments that use double strings are the bandolón, and the guitarra séptima, the guitarra quinta huapanguera, the bajo sexto (México). and the 12-string folk guitar from Huánuco and Puno, the 14-string guitar from Cusco, and the 12-string requinto from Arequipa (Peru).

In the 19th and early 20th centuries, 12-strings were regarded as "novelty" instruments. The 12-string guitar did not become a major part of blues and folk music till the 1920s and the 1930s, when their "larger than life" sound made them ideal as solo accompaniment for vocalists, especially Lead Belly and Blind Willie McTell. The 12-string guitar has since occupied roles in certain varieties of folk, rock, jazz, and popular music. In the 1930s, Mexican-American guitarist and singer Lydia Mendoza popularized the instrument. In the 1950s, Lead Belly's protégé, Fred Gerlach, brought the instrument into the American folk music world. Initially, it was primarily used for accompaniment, owing to the greater difficulty of picking or executing string "bends" on its double-strung courses. The Delta Blues guitar virtuoso Robert Lockwood Jr was presented a handcrafted acoustic 12-string guitar made by an outstanding Japanese luthier in the end of the sixties, and this became the instrument of choice for Lockwood thereafter. In the later 20th century, however, a number of players devoted themselves to producing solo performances on the 12-string guitar, including Roger Hodgson, Leo Kottke, Peter Lang, John McLaughlin, Larry Coryell, Ralph Towner, Robbie Basho, Roger Whittaker, Jack Rose, and James Blackshaw.

=== Electric 12-string guitars ===
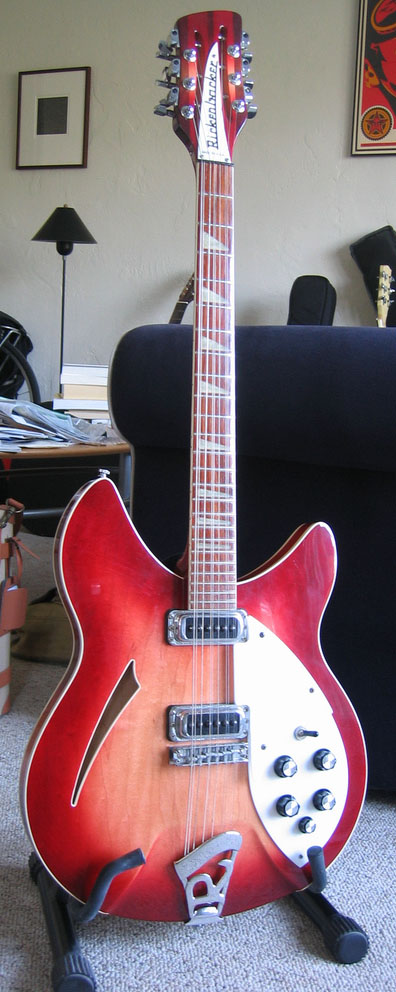
A reissue of the 1964 Rickenbacker 360 12-string guitar

Electric 12-strings became a staple in pop and rock music in the 1960s. Early use of the instrument was pioneered by the studio session guitarists of the Wrecking Crew; in 1963, Carol Kaye used a converted Guild six-string on the Crystals' hit "Then He Kissed Me", and on Jackie DeShannon's song "When You Walk in the Room". Glen Campbell played a well-known guitar figure, composed by DeShannon, on an electric 12-string.

One of the first mass-produced electric 12-strings was the Bellzouki. Introduced by Danelectro in 1961 from a design by session guitarist Vinnie Bell, it was initially considered a cross between an electric guitar and a bouzouki rather than an electric version of the traditional 12-string guitar. In the UK in 1963, JMI briefly produced the Vox Bouzouki, later produced in Italy as The Vox Tempest XII, which was used by Vic Flick on the Peter and Gordon hit single "A World Without Love" in 1964. In late 1963, Burns developed the Double Six, supplying a prototype to Hank Marvin of the Shadows, who used it on a number of songs for the soundtrack of the 1964 Cliff Richard movie Wonderful Life; the Double Six was also used on the Searchers' cover version of De Shannon's "When You Walk in the Room."

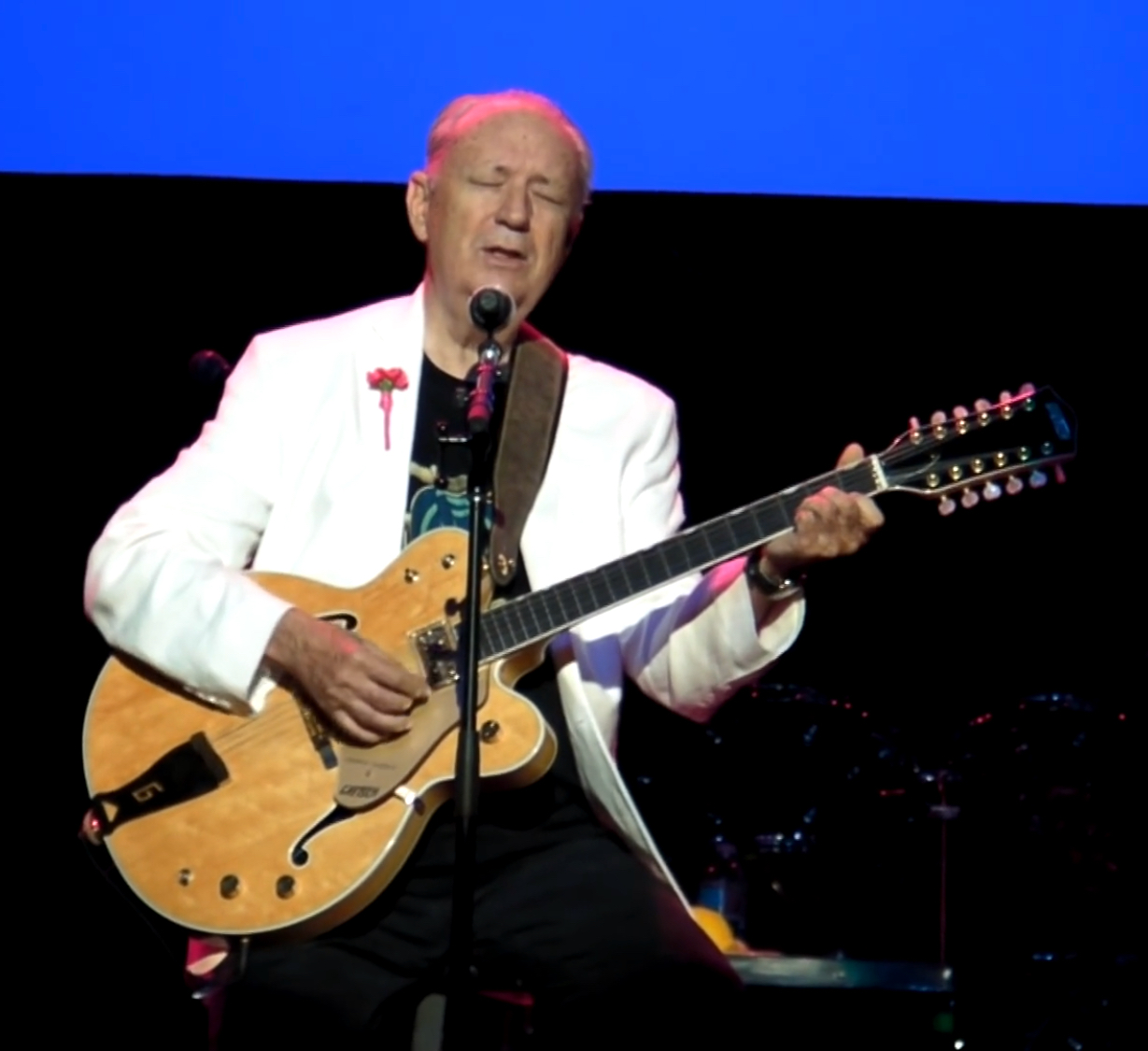
Monkees guitarist Michael Nesmith playing his signature model Gretsch Model 6076

The electric 12-string gained prominence with the introduction in 1964 of the Rickenbacker 360, made famous through George Harrison's use of it on the Beatles' album A Hard Day's Night and many subsequent recordings. In 1965, inspired by Harrison, Roger McGuinn made the Rickenbacker 12-string central to the Byrds' folk rock sound, further popularising the instrument.

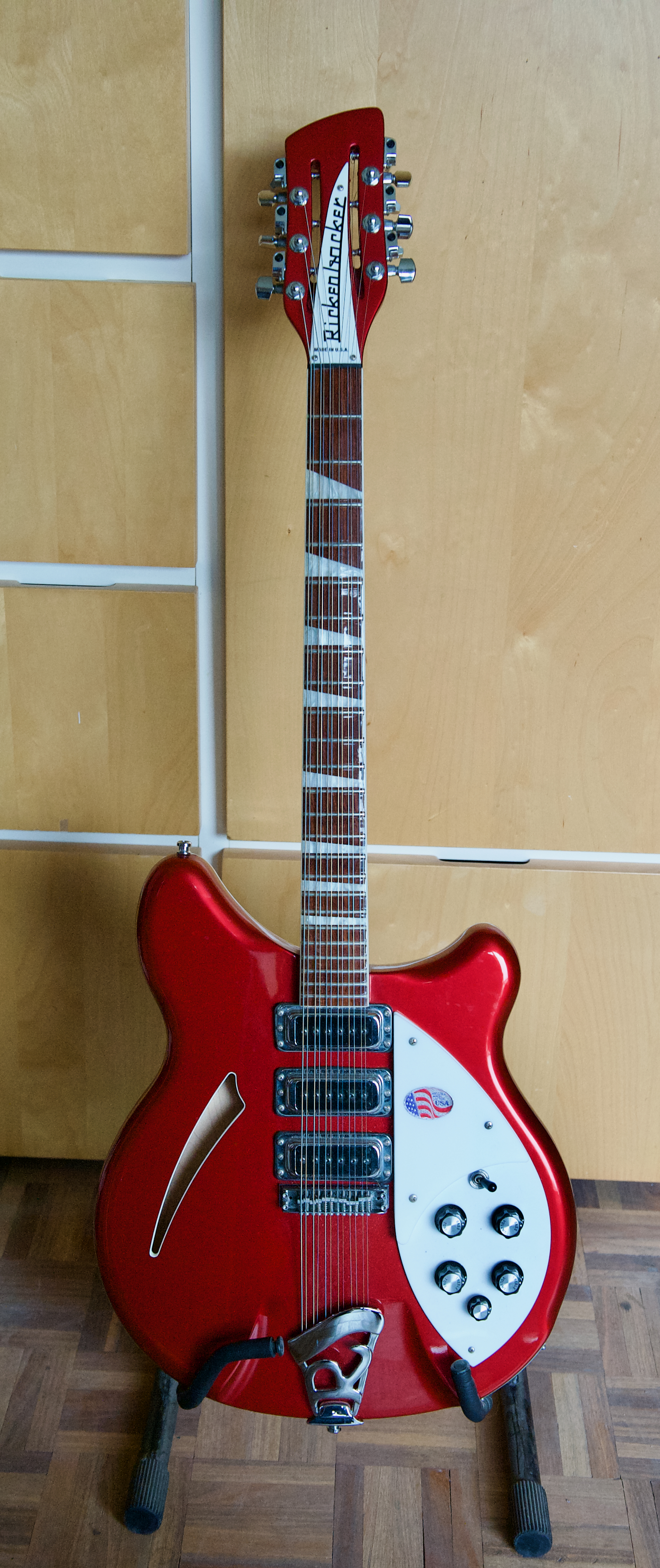
A limited edition 1988–1989 Rickenbacker 370/12 RM Roger McGuinn 12-string guitar (without his signature on the pickguard and without electronic compressor)

By the mid-1960s, most major guitar manufacturers were producing competing instruments, including the Fender Electric XII (used by Roy Wood of the Move), and the Vox Phantom XII (used by Tony Hicks of the Hollies). Gretsch, Guild, and Gibson also produced electric 12-string models from the mid-Sixties and following decades, with Gretsch promoting theirs by supplying a number of custom made 12-strings for the Monkees guitarist Michael Nesmith, for use on The Monkees TV series.

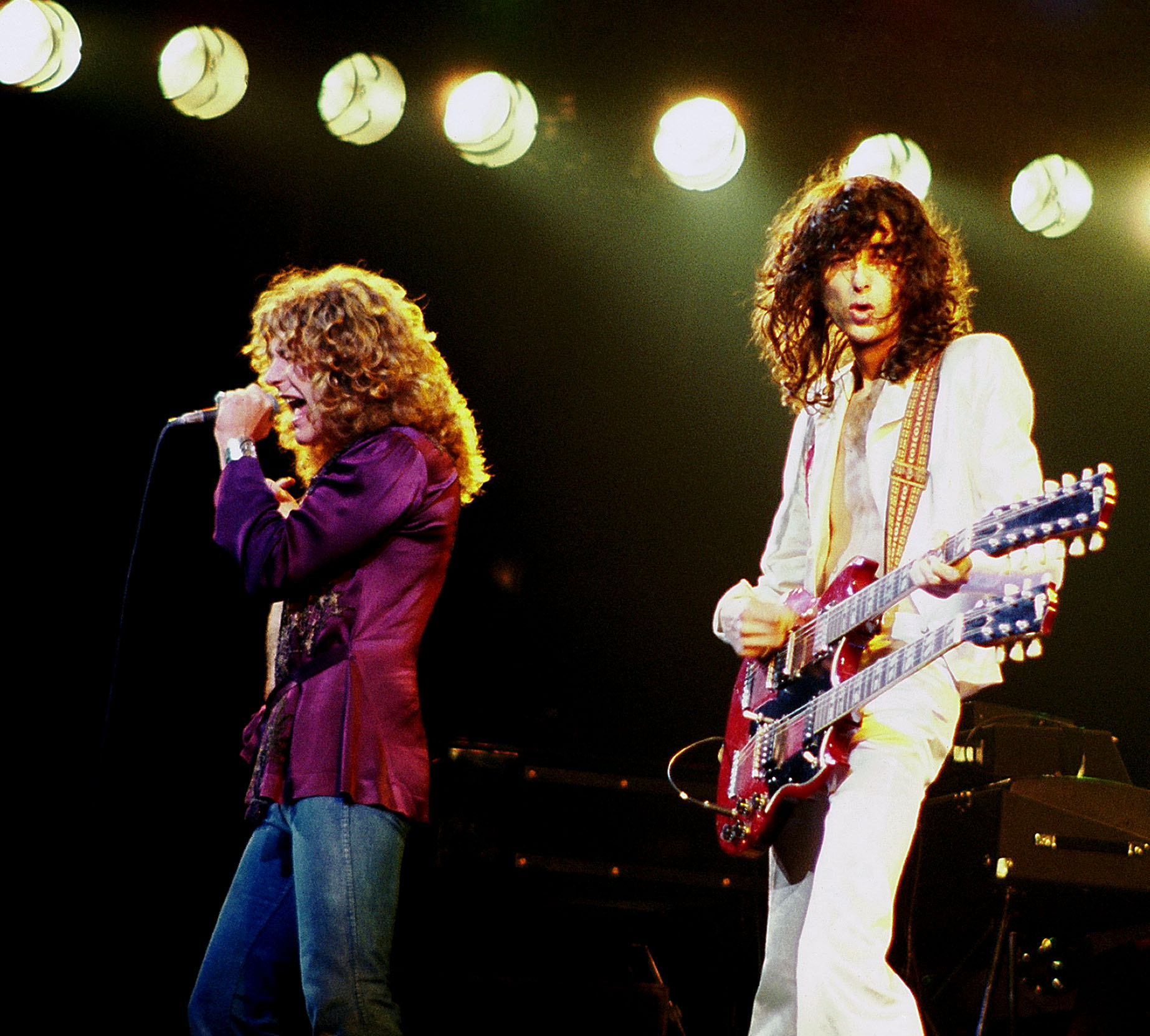
Jimmy Page onstage in Chicago with Led Zeppelin, using the Gibson EDS-1275 double neck guitar

Standard electric 12-strings became less popular with the end of the American folk rock scene in the late sixties; Fender and Gibson ceased production of the Electric XII and ES-335 12-string variant respectively, in 1969. However, from the 1970s, some progressive rock, hard rock, and jazz fusion guitarists, most notably Jimmy Page of Led Zeppelin, Don Felder of the Eagles, John McLaughlin of the Mahavishnu Orchestra and Alex Lifeson of Rush used double-necked guitars, such as the Gibson EDS-1275, with six-string and 12-string necks, for live appearances, allowing easy transition between different sounds mid-song.

The post punk era of the late '70s and early '80s saw a resurgence of electric 12-string guitar use among '60s-influenced alternative rock, pop, and indie guitarists. Players such as Johnny Marr of the Smiths, Dave Gregory of XTC, Susanna Hoffs of the Bangles, Marty Willson-Piper of the Church, Peter Buck of R.E.M., and Tom Petty and Mike Campbell of Tom Petty and the Heartbreakers often chose 12-strings (particularly Rickenbackers) for many songs.

In the 1980s, John C. Hall, president of Rickenbacker, invited Roger McGuinn to participate in a limited-edition signature model; McGuinn was delighted. Roger McGuinn's signature model Rickenbacker 12-string was introduced in 1988 as the 370/12 RME1.

== Design ==
The strings are placed in courses of two strings each that are usually played together. The two strings in each of the lower four courses are normally tuned an octave apart, while each pair of strings in the top two courses are tuned in unison. The strings are generally arranged such that the higher string of each pair is struck first on a downward strum. However, Rickenbacker usually reverses this arrangement on its electric 12-string guitars. The tuning of the second string in the third course (G) varies. Some players use a unison string, while most prefer the distinctive high-pitched, bell-like quality an octave string makes in this position. Another common variant is to tune the octave string in the sixth (lowest) course two octaves above the lower string, rather than one. Some players, either in search of distinctive tone or for ease of playing, remove some doubled strings. For example, removing the higher octave from the three bass courses simplifies playing running bass lines, but keeps the extra treble strings for the full strums. Some manufacturers have produced 9-string instruments based on this setup, in which either the lower three courses are singular, or the upper three courses are singular. Additionally; some players adapted more unconventional stringing: for example, Big Joe Williams used doubled strings on the 1st, 2nd and 4th courses of his guitars; at first adapted six-string instruments and into the sixties and later usually adapted 12-strings.

The extra tension placed on the instrument by the doubled strings is high, applying extra stress to their necks and soundboards. 12-string guitars long had a reputation for warping after a few years of use; improvements in construction techniques after 1970 reduced warping. Until the wide spread adoption by American makers of the truss rod after WWII, 12-string guitars were frequently tuned lower than the traditional EADGBE to reduce the stresses on the instrument. For example, Lead Belly often used a low-C tuning, but in some recordings, his tunings can be recognized as low-B and A tunings, partially due to the unusually long scale length (~26.5–27") of the particular models of guitar that he preferred in combination with the heavy strings that were commonly available (14–70). Some 12-string guitars have nontraditional structural supports to prevent or postpone warping, at the expense of appearance and tone.

To additionally reduce string tension, 12-string guitars built prior to 1970 typically had shorter necks and scale lengths than six-string guitars, which made frets more closely spaced, with some notable exceptions such as the instruments made by the Oscar Schmidt company before their bankruptcy, which usually had scale lengths of around 26.5". Their bridges, especially in acoustic guitars, had a larger reinforcement plate for the same reason, and tailpiece and floating-bridge setups were far more common than on six string instruments as another way to combat the effect of the high tension.

Advances in materials, design, and construction in such guitars made after 1970 have eliminated most of these accommodations. Contemporary 12 string guitars are commonly built to the same dimensions and scale as their six-string counterparts, albeit still usually with heavier build and bracing.

== Tuning ==
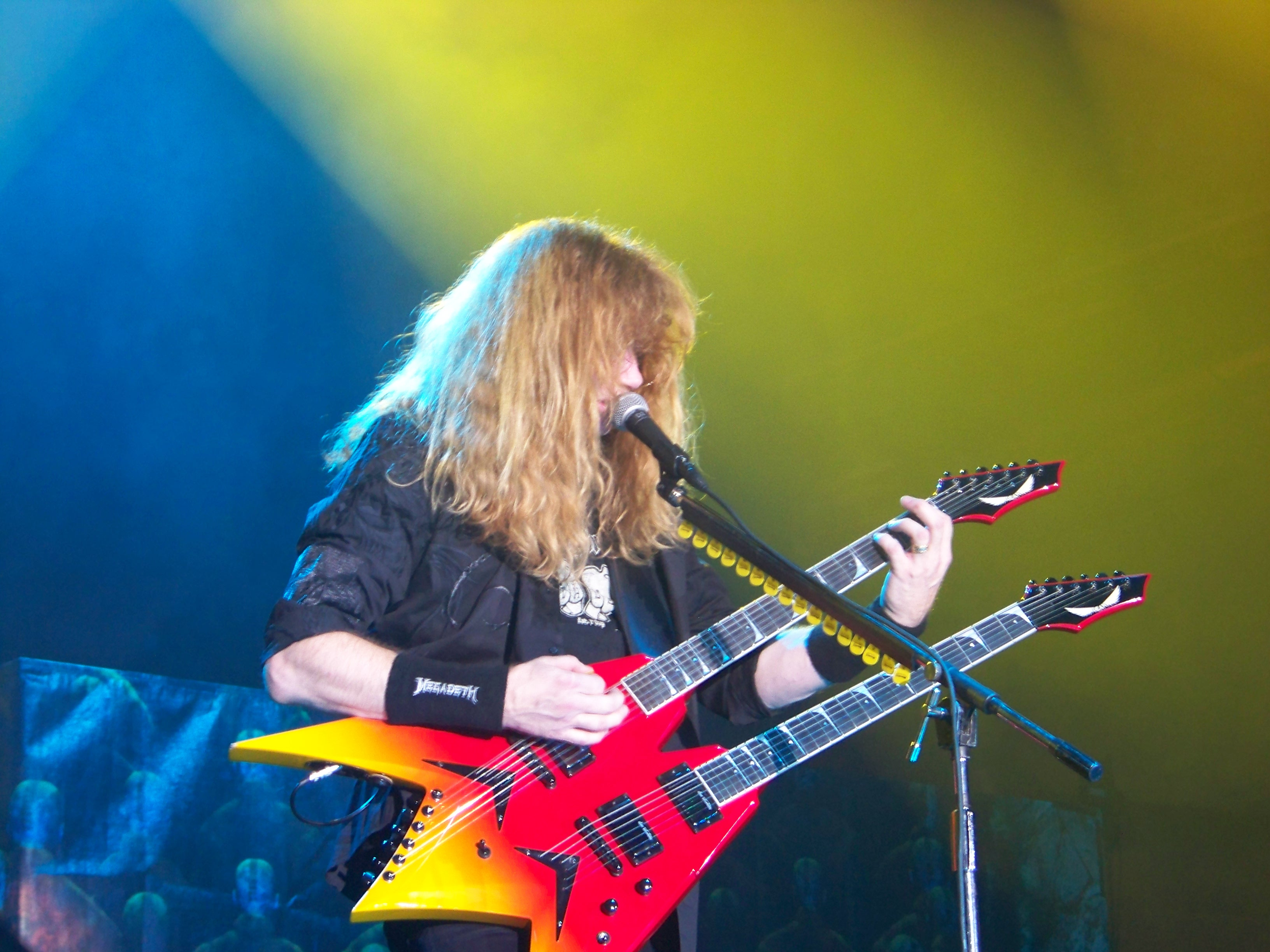
Dave Mustaine of Megadeth playing a Dean twin neck. Note the machine heads for the 12 string secondary strings on the edge of the body.

The most common tuning, considered standard today, is a variation on the standard six-string guitar tuning: E_{3}•E_{2} A_{3}•A_{2} D_{4}•D_{3} G_{4}•G_{3} B_{3}•B_{3} E_{4}•E_{4}, moving from lowest (sixth) course to highest (first) course. Lead Belly and some other players have doubled the lowest course two octaves above instead of one, producing a third string in unison with the top course, and some stringing the third course in unison as well, and some others all courses except the top in octaves.

Some performers use open tunings and other non-standard guitar tunings on 12-string guitars. Some performers have experimented with tuning the two strings within a course to intervals other than octaves or unisons: jazz guitarists such as Ralph Towner (of Oregon), Larry Coryell, and Philip Catherine have tuned the bass courses of their 12-string guitars to the upper fifths and trebles to the lower fourths instead of octaves and unisons; Michael Gulezian tuned strings in the top two courses to whole-tone intervals (and possibly some of the other strings an octave lower) to achieve a very rich, complex sound. The greater number of strings offers almost endless possibilities.

=== Nashville tuning ===
Nashville tuning is a way of simulating a 12-string guitar sound, using two six-string guitars playing in unison. This is achieved by replacing the lower four courses on one six-string with the higher octave strings for those four courses from a 12-string set, and tuning these four strings an octave higher than normal tuning for those courses on a six-string. Double-tracking this guitar with the standard-tuned six-string is commonly used in recording studios to achieve a "cleaner" 12-string effect.

=== Mexican 12-string tuning ===
Mexican twelve-string guitars, also known as requinto style or Sierreño style, are modified 12-string guitars that can approximate the sound of a bajo sexto or bajo quinto and play regional Mexican styles, such as norteño (music of Northern Mexico), Tejano (Tex-Mex), and conjunto (música mexicana-tejana). In a traditional 12-string setup, the lower four strings (E, A, D, and G) have octave pairs, while the top two (B and E) have unison pairs. However, for regional Mexican styles, all strings are set up with identical unison pairs instead of the traditional octave courses. This configuration yields a resonant timbre reminiscent of the venerable bajo sexto, but adds significantly more tension on the bridge and neck. Furthermore, it usually requires the nut to be modified, the neck compensated, and the bridge to be reinforced.

== Playing ==
The 12-string guitar's greater number of strings and higher cumulative string tension complicates playing, in both hands. Fretting chords requires greater force, and the width of the neck and the added string tension combine to make soloing and string-bending challenging. The gap between the dual-string courses is usually narrower than that between the single-string courses of a conventional six-string guitar, so more precision is required with the pick or fingertip when not simply strumming chords. Consequently, the instrument is most commonly used for accompaniment, though several players have taken the time to develop the 12-string guitar as a solo instrument. Flat-picking solos are more frequently seen with electric players, whereas a few acoustic players, such as Leo Kottke, have adapted fingerstyle techniques to the instrument; players such as Ralph Towner have applied classical playing techniques.

Roger McGuinn developed his own style of playing a 12-string guitar. The neck of a Rickenbacker 360/12 12-string guitar is as wide as the 6-string guitar. Solos are therefore easier to play and he used his banjo techniques to play chords. Another feature unique to Rickenbacker 12-strings is the ordering of the courses. Most 12-strings have the octave course on the bass side of the standard course; Rickenbacker reverses this convention. This feature, along with the semi-hollow body design and thru-body neck structure, contribute to its unique timbre. In addition to applying a compressor, this determined the sound of the Byrds. Lead Belly adapted both the traditional, simple strum style and the finger-style method that was becoming popular at the time as well; Blind Willie McTell also played finger-style 12 string.

== See also ==
- Colombian tiple – Plucked string instrument
- Portuguese guitar – Plucked string instrument with twelve steel strings
- Twelve-string bass – Bass guitar with 12 strings instead of the usual 4 or 6 strings
- Viola caipira – Brazilian string musical instrument
- "Walk Right In" - One of the first songs to popularise twelve-string guitars within blues.
