= Gilberto Ojeda Camacho =

Mexican politician

- Born: 7 March 1957 (age 69); Guamúchil, Sinaloa, Mexico
- Occupation: Politician
- Political party: PRI

Gilberto Ojeda Camacho (born 7 March 1957) is a Mexican politician from the Institutional Revolutionary Party (PRI). In the 2006 general election he was elected to the Chamber of Deputies to represent Sinaloa's 3rd district during the 60th session of Congress.
