= Los Cuates de Sinaloa =

Regional Mexican band

- Origin: La Vainilla, Sinaloa, Mexico
- Genres: Regional Mexican; sierreño
- Label: Sony BMG

Los Cuates de Sinaloa (English: The Homies of Sinaloa) are a regional Mexican band from La Vainilla, Sinaloa, that are active in the sierreño genre. Led by cousins Gabriel and Nano Berrelleza, they are currently based in Phoenix, Arizona. In 2006, The band signed to Sony BMG. Their 2006 album, Puro Sierreno Bravo, peaked at #13 on the Billboard Top Latin Albums. They are known for their narcocorrido song "Negro y Azul: The Ballad of Heisenberg", which was featured as the opening for the crime drama television series Breaking Bad episode of the same name, with a performance from the band.

== Charting albums ==
- Mi Sangre en Licor – unknown; September 9, 2016
- Puro Sierreño Bravo – 6; April 14, 2007
- Mi Santito Preferido – 9; November 8, 2008
- Los Gallos Más Caros – 10; September 22, 2007
- Puros Exitos Chacas – 11; April 19, 2008
- Pegando con Tuba – 20; June 13, 2009
- Puro Cartel – 36; March 13, 2010
- Tocando with the Mafia – 41; April 30, 2011
