= Abraham Velázquez Iribe =

Mexican politician

- Born: 17 March 1953 (age 73); Sinaloa, Mexico
- Occupation: Politician
- Political party: PRI

Abraham Velázquez Iribe (born 17 March 1953) is a Mexican politician affiliated with the Institutional Revolutionary Party (PRI).

In the 2003 mid-terms he was elected to the Chamber of Deputies to represent Sinaloa's 3rd district during the 59th session of Congress. He stood down from his seat on 1 August 2004 and was replaced by his alternate, Rosa Hilda Valenzuela Rodelo.
