= Mocorito Municipality =

Municipality in the Mexican state of Sinaloa

Municipality of Mocorito
- Municipality
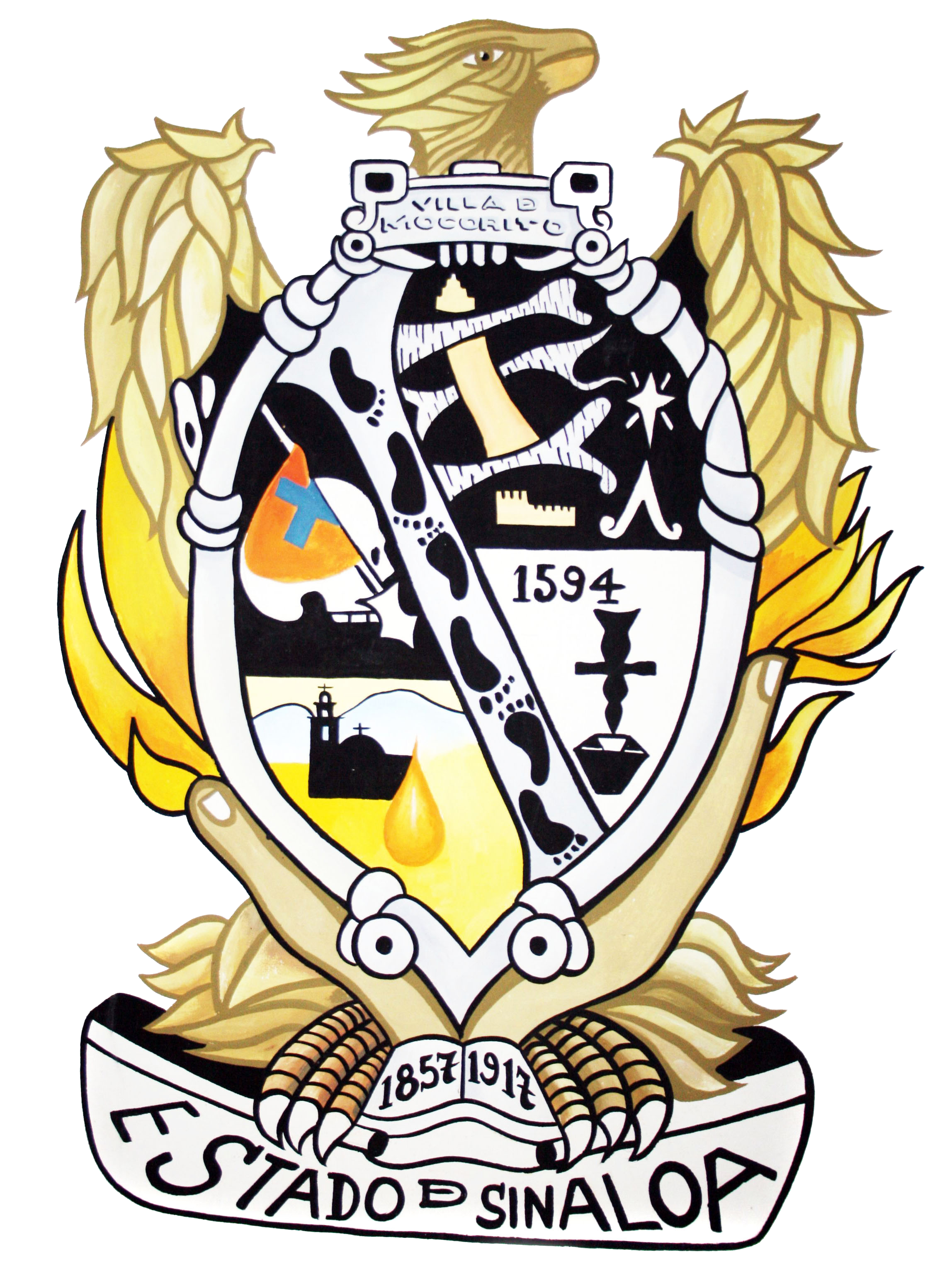
- Coat of arms

- Location of the municipality in Sinaloa
- Coordinates: 25°29′00″N 107°55′00″W
- Country: Mexico
- State: Sinaloa
- Seat: Mocorito

Government
  - Municipal President: María Elizalde Ruelas

Area
  - Total: 2,800 km^{2} (1,100 sq mi)
- Elevation: 187 m (614 ft)

Population (2020)
  - Total: 30,358
  - Density: 14.4/km^{2} (37/sq mi)
- Time zone: UTC-7 (Mountain Standard Time)
- Website: www.mocorito.gob.mx

Mocorito is a municipality in the Mexican state of Sinaloa in northwestern Mexico. It is bordered to the north by the municipality of Sinaloa, to the south by Navolato, to the southeast by Culiacán, to the east by Badiraguato and to the west with Salvador Alvarado and Angostura. It encompasses a total of 2,800.6 km^{2} (1,081.3 sq mi) and represents 4.9% of the territory of Sinaloa. According to the 2020 census it had a population of 40,358, compromising 270 total localities. Major localities include Pericos, Mocorito, and Caimanero.

== Flora and Fauna ==
The three climatic regions that make up Sinaloa can be seen in Mocorito. Tropical savanna in the west, mountainous in the east, and a transitional zone in the central region. Each has its own vegetation. The mountainous regions are composed of conifers, oaks, and pine trees. In the foothills amapas, ebony, cedar, and juniper trees are commonly found. The coastal region of Mocorito is abundant with various grasses and bushes, mangroves, Manila tamarinds, mesquites, and wild fig trees.

Most arable land in Mocorito is used to farm temporary crops. This includes rice, soybeans, safflower, wheat, cottonseed, sesame, beans, cotton, sugarcane, and corn. Fruit trees are also grown; this includes melon, watermelon, avocado, mango, orange, and papaya.

Cattle raised include pigs, goats, and sheep. The wildlife include deer, hare, rabbits, armadillos, iguanas, and more. Predators also proliferate in the area, with animals such as wildcats, ocelots, and mountain lions living deep in the mountainous regions.

== Climate ==
Climate data for Culiacán International Airport
Month	Jan	Feb	Mar	Apr	May	Jun	Jul	Aug	Sep	Oct	Nov	Dec	Year
Record high °F	102.69	104.59	106.5	106.5	110.32	112.23	110.32	108.42	106.5	108.41	106.5	102.69	112.23
Mean daily maximum °F	87.06	88.75	93.69	96.42	100.11	100.26	98.74	98.29	97.05	98.1	93.29	87.03	94.89
Daily mean °F	74.97	77.11	81.97	85.69	90.32	92.08	91.54	90.63	89.13	88.09	82.0	75.29	84.9
Mean daily minimum °F	60.31	63.25	66.76	72.61	79.54	81.03	78.71	76.84	76.84	72.68	66.63	60.93	69.89
Record low °F	47.28	35.82	49.19	56.84	60.66	70.21	74.03	74.03	70.21	60.66	51.5	47.28	35.82
Average precipitation inches	0.53	1.31	0.27	0.13	0.27	2.59	7.5	8.55	8.87	2.14	1.85	0.96	2.91
Record high °C	39.27	40.33	41.4	41.4	43.51	44.57	43.51	42.46	41.4	42.45	41.4	39.27	44.57
Mean daily maximum °C	30.59	31.53	34.27	35.79	37.84	37.92	37.08	36.83	36.14	36.7	34.05	30.57	34.94
Daily mean °C	23.87	25.06	27.76	29.83	32.40	33.38	33.08	32.57	31.74	31.16	27.8	24.05	29.4
Mean daily minimum °C	15.73	17.36	19.31	22.56	26.41	27.24	25.95	24.91	24.91	22.60	19.24	16.07	21.05
Record low °C	8.49	2.12	9.55	13.80	15.92	21.23	23.35	23.35	21.23	15.92	10.8	8.49	2.12
Average precipitation mm	13	33	6.9	3.3	6.9	66	190	217	225	54	47	24	74
Average precipitation days	2.41	3.09	1.25	0.29	1.44	13.12	27.5	28.27	22.57	6.56	4.25	2.6	9.45
Average relative humidity (%)	51.43	51.29	43.56	44.07	44.1	60.87	71.35	79.08	79.36	67.52	56.58	54.74	58.66
Mean daily sunshine hours	8.98	11.14	12.02	13.53	14.0	14.35	13.97	13.5	12.75	9.15	9.1	8.97	11.79
Source 1:
Source 2:

== Demographics ==
=== Localities ===
The 10 largest localities according to the 2010 INEGI census are as follows:

Locality	Population
Total	40,358
Pericos	6,244
Mocorito	5,926
Caimanero	1,881
Melchor Ocampo	1,933
Recoveco	1,618
Higuera de los Vega	1,256
Potrero de los Sánchez (Estación Techa)	1,205
Cerro Agudo	1,003
El Valle de Leyva Solano (El Valle)	955
Rancho Viejo	838
