= Octavio Paredes López =

Mexican biochemical engineer and food scientist

Octavio Paredes López (born 1946 in Mocorito, Sinaloa), is a Mexican biochemical engineer and food scientist. He is a past president of the Mexican Academy of Sciences, a founding member of the International Academy of Food Science and Technology, and a member of the Governing Board of the National Autonomous University of Mexico. He received the National Prize for Arts and Sciences in 1991 and the Third World Network of Scientific Organizations Award in 1998.

Paredes López obtained bachelor's and master's degrees in biochemical engineering at the National Polytechnic Institute in Mexico City, and later earned a master's degree in food science at Czechoslovak Academy of Sciences in Prague. He earned his doctorate (1980) at the University of Manitoba, Canada, which awarded him an honorary Doctor of Science in 2005. He has conducted research and postdoctoral stays in the United States, Britain, France, Germany, Switzerland, Czechoslovakia and Brazil. He has served as general editor of the journal Plant Foods for Human Nutrition and associate editor of Food Science and Technology International.
