= Mocorito =

City in the Mexican state of Sinaloa

Mocorito, Sinaloa, Mexico
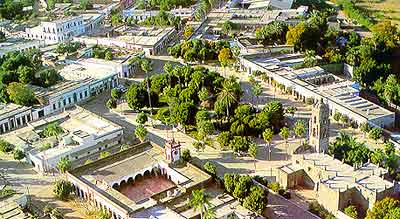

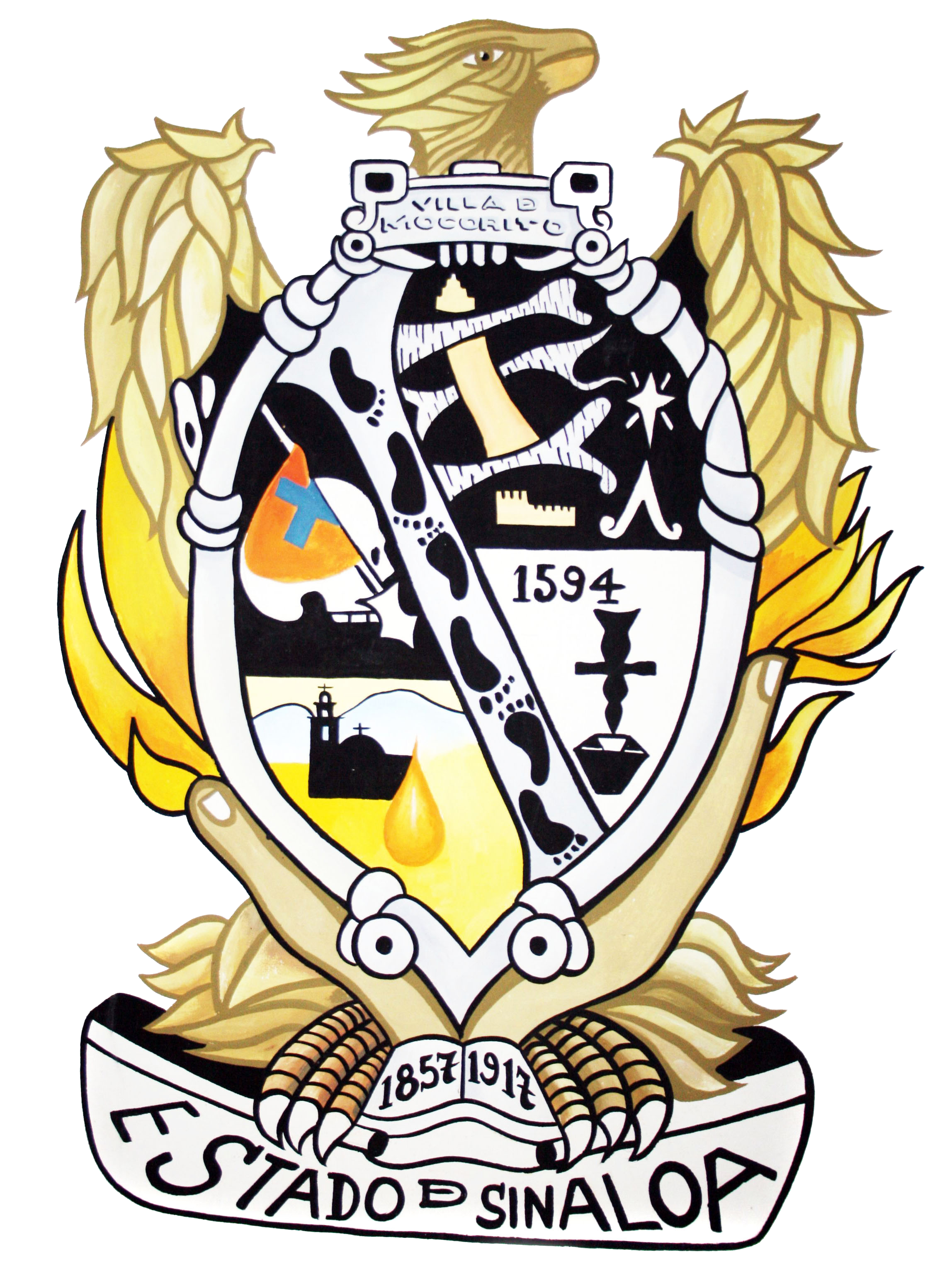
- Seal
- Nickname: La Atenas de Sinaloa
- Location in Mexico
- Coordinates: 25°28′54″N 107°55′17″W
- Country: Mexico
- State: Sinaloa
- Municipality: Mocorito
- Founded in: 1594

Government
  - Municipal president: Guillermo Galindo Castro

Area 4.4%
  - Land: 2,566 km^{2} (991 sq mi)

Population (2020)
  - Total: 5,926
- Time zone: UTC-7 (Mountain Standard Time)
- Postal code: 80800
- Website: Mocorito Government page

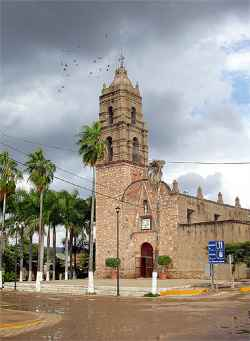
Immaculate Conception Church at the front of Mocorito's main plaza.

Mocorito (Spanish pronunciation: [mo.koˈɾi.to]) (From Cahita, meaning "place where people speak macuri (dialect of Mayo)" or "place of the dead") is the municipality seat of the Municipality of Mocorito in the Mexican state of Sinaloa.

The city reported 5,926 inhabitants in the 2020 census.

== Indigenous Groups ==
At the time of the Spanish contact, the Cáhita group of tribes were living in pueblos and permanent villages along the banks of the Mocorito, Sinaloa, Fuerte, Mayo and Yaqui Rivers in the coastal regions of both southern Sonora and northern Sinaloa. The Cáhitan group is part of the Uto-Aztecan Language Group and is most closely related to the Pima and Cora languages.

== Etymology ==
Professor Héctor R. Olea indicates that Mocorito is a Cáhita term, a variant of "macori-to," composed of macuri, an apocopation of "macorihui," a modification of the term "macoyahuy," referring to a group of Mayo Indians or people who speak a dialect of the Cahita language; additionally, the suffix "to" denotes location, place; the place name means "place of people who speak a dialect of the Cahita language, or where the Mayo Indians or macoritos reside."

Other historians, such as Mr. Eustaquio Buelna, lean towards translating Mocorito as "place of the dead."

== History ==
In the year 1531, with the arrival of the conqueror Nuño de Guzmán to the northwest of Mexico and the founding of the town of San Miguel de Navito, the geographic demarcation of the province of Culiacán began, subject to the governance of New Galicia. In 1532, Sebastián de Evora reached the valley of Mocorito and named it after himself, both the town and the river, becoming an encomendero under the major alcalde of the province of Culiacán, which from that year was delimited between the Evora River to the north and the Elota River to the south.

In 1594, the Mission of Mocorito was founded by Jesuits Juan Bautista Velasco and Hernando de Santarán.

By 1732, when the Spanish expansion reached beyond the Yaqui River, the territory was divided into provinces. That year, Sonora and Sinaloa were first located to form a single governance with its capital in the town of San Felipe and Santiago de Sinaloa, today Sinaloa de Leyva.

In Sinaloa territory, the internal division of 3 provinces persisted: Sinaloa, Culiacán, and Chametla, whose boundaries were the Mayo River to the north and the Cañas River to the south.

In 1749, the territory was divided into 5 provinces, and although Mocorito seemingly remained under the jurisdiction of the province of Culiacán, in the record of "Los Pueblos, Villas, Lugares de Indios y Reales de Minas" (The Towns, Villages, Indian Places, and Royal Mines), with expression of their jurisdictions made at that time, within the jurisdiction of Culiacán were the towns of Capirato, Comanito, and Palos Blancos; and within the jurisdiction of Sinaloa, the mission of Mocorito and the town of San Benito.

In 1813, the Constitution of Cádiz came into effect; Article 310 contemplated the installation of municipalities in populations that had more than 1,000 inhabitants.

In 1814, Ferdinand VII repealed the constitution, but it was reinstated in 1820. From this point on, the first municipalities of Sinaloa were established.

The creation of the Estado de Occidente in 1824, joining the provinces of Sonora and Sinaloa, and the internal division of this state into five departments with their respective districts, did not modify the internal situation of the Sinaloan territory with respect to Mocorito, as the department of Culiacán was formed with the district of its name and that of Cosalá, including the region of Mocorito within it, with the boundaries from the river of its name to the Elota River.

In 1830, the definitive separation of Sonora and Sinaloa was decreed to form their independent federal entities. The new state of Sinaloa was divided into eleven districts, with Mocorito being one of them, which within its jurisdiction, marked the limits on the north side of the coast, the town of Playa Colorada, and towards the mountains, the town of Corral Quemado, adjacent to the district of Badiraguato; by the same mountain range, to the south, it bordered the district of Culiacán and the town of Ocualtita; heading towards Jesús María almost reaching the coast, with the town of Aguapepe and with Los Toldos, opposite the island of Tachichilte.

Mocorito was established as a Municipality by decree published on April 8, 1915. In 1916, Mocorito experienced a reduction in its geographic extension when the political directorate of Angostura became a Municipality. In 1962, it underwent a new reduction upon the formation of the municipality of Salvador Alvarado.

=== Meaning of the coat of arms ===
During the tenure of mayor Luis Verduzco Leal, the coat of arms for the municipality of Mocorito was created in 1964 by Mr. Miguel Angel Velázquez Tracy. It was designed in an oval shape, split into four sections, with a border made out of stone to honor the indigenous origin, reflecting their unfamiliarity with metal and featuring footprints oriented from northwest to southeast in greater number and from southeast to northwest in fewer numbers. This symbolizes the Nahuatl pilgrimage that populated Sinaloa, and Mocorito in particular.

In the top left section of the shield, a black background represents the darkness of prehistory.

The top right section signifies the dawn of Mocorito's history. At the top of the section there's a small building alongside the Sinaloa River with a road crossing a river which represents the Mocorito River. The path ends at the convergences of the Humaya and Tamazula rivers with a larger building respresentin city of San Miguel de Culiacán.

In the bottom right section, on a silver background, an indigenous-styled hermitage with the date 1594 signifies the founding of the Mocorito mission.

In the bottom left section, a gold background symbolizes the zenith of the colonial history, the current church, and above it an orange drop originating from a hill symbolizing gold exploitation. The flame-like mantle outside the border signifies the patriotic movements, the open book with the dates 1857-1917 represents the constitutions, and the spread eagle in bronze signifies the nation, holding a banner with the words "Estado de Sinaloa" (State of Sinaloa).

== Culture and traditions ==
=== Carnival ===
The carnival has been held in Mocorito years ago. On the first day people gather expecting the identity of temper that evening burn is known. The second day is the crowning of the Queen of the Floral Games. On the third day, the coronation of the Queen of Carnival takes place. On Sunday is the first tour of floats and bands. Monday is the coronation of the Kings and Children ride floats and to close with a flourish, on Tuesday, the traditional walk is performed, to the best allegorical cars and bands are rewarded and culminates with a large popular dance.

=== Music ===
The music could not miss as it is one of the deepest traditions. José Rubio Quinonez heir of the Sinaloa music, promoter of the popular bands of Sinaloa. The band "Los Hermanos Rubio Mocorito" has toured the country from Tijuana to Mexico City, playing the merry notes of the drum: sones "The Lost Child", "El Toro Viejo", "Brisas de Mocorito", "The Sinaloa "," El Palo Verde "and many more.

=== Characters and Artists of Mocorito ===
Mocorito was called at a time "The Athens of Sinaloa" as it has been distinguished by its innate vocation to the fine arts. It was the seat of a cultural range that is proud of Sinaloa. Several in Mocorito found inspiration for their works whether literary, artistic, historical or transformative. The great muralist David Alfaro Siqueiros recalled that in this place joined the forces of revolution. When he was released he intended to return to the place as a symbol reiterating its struggle for a better Mexico. Jose Ramon Velazquez, writer of facts and anecdotes. Their stories come from the voices of people with their main theme is Mocorito. Hector Lopez Gamez, painter Mocoritense, majored in Law and Social Sciences obligation, then studied fine arts for fun in a US school. He leans in the human figure, landscapes and surreal themes. Ernesto Rios, painter and muralist Mocoritense. In the beginning, he focused on portraits of those who managed to make more than three thousand in four years later, mature, he was attracted by the murals that have given popularity with shows in several Mexican states projecting that done in Revolution Park Culiacan and the library of the Autonomous University of Sinaloa in Guamúchil. Dr. Enrique Peña Gutierrez, physician, poet and writer. He was part of a scientific committee that made the study of leprosy and tuberculosis in Sinaloa to the Mexican Academy of Medicine. Then he took up farming producing Fertimoc, a fertilizer that helps to increase production in crops. He edited the magazine "gaps" and wrote the book "Were Five Horse" among others. DR. Jose Dominguez Law, medical, humanitarian, philanthropist and social activist. Concerned about the village, founded the Ateneo Professor Constancio Rodriguez gave luster to Mocorito in the cultural both regionally and nationally, for its management connection to electricity CFE was achieved. The water system was introduced, the recognition of high school, health center, among others. He was a fighter always upright for an unprotected world.

== Demographics ==
=== Population dynamics ===
Population	2020
Women	3,043
Men	2,883
Ages 0-14	1,368
Ages 15-29	1,354
Ages 30-59	2,125
Ages 60+	1,078
Disabled population	340
Total Population	5,926

Religion
Population	2020
Roman Catholic	5,137
Protestant	332
No Religion	452

== Geography ==
=== Flora and fauna ===
Mocorito contains the three climatic regions found throughout Sinaloa: tropical savannah on the west; mountain in the east and a transition zone in the central area. Three levels of vegetation are featured: conifers, oaks, oaks and pines in the high mountains; amapas, ebony, cedars and junipers in its foothills, and herbs and shrubs in the coastal area where mangroves thrive, guamuchileros, mesquite and wild figs. Most of the farmland is temporary, with crops such as rice, soybean, safflower, corn, cottonseed, sesame, beans, sorghum and cotton in bales, sugarcane, corn; fruits such as cantaloupe, watermelon, avocado, mango, orange and papaya.

The main breeds are cattle, pigs, goats and sheep. Wildlife includes deer, hares, rabbits, armadillos, iguanas, and wild cats.

=== Climate ===
Climate data for Mocorito (1951–2010)
Month	Jan	Feb	Mar	Apr	May	Jun	Jul	Aug	Sep	Oct	Nov	Dec	Year
Record high °C (°F)	39.0 (102.2)	38.0 (100.4)	38.5 (101.3)	42.5 (108.5)	44.0 (111.2)	45.0 (113.0)	43.5 (110.3)	42.0 (107.6)	42.0 (107.6)	42.0 (107.6)	39.5 (103.1)	35.5 (95.9)	45.0 (113.0)
Mean daily maximum °C (°F)	26.9 (80.4)	28.6 (83.5)	31.2 (88.2)	34.3 (93.7)	37.0 (98.6)	38.0 (100.4)	36.1 (97.0)	35.0 (95.0)	34.7 (94.5)	33.8 (92.8)	30.9 (87.6)	27.4 (81.3)	32.8 (91.0)
Daily mean °C (°F)	18.6 (65.5)	19.6 (67.3)	21.3 (70.3)	24.1 (75.4)	27.3 (81.1)	30.7 (87.3)	30.2 (86.4)	29.3 (84.7)	29.0 (84.2)	27.0 (80.6)	23.0 (73.4)	19.4 (66.9)	25.0 (77.0)
Mean daily minimum °C (°F)	10.4 (50.7)	10.6 (51.1)	11.5 (52.7)	13.8 (56.8)	17.5 (63.5)	23.3 (73.9)	24.3 (75.7)	23.6 (74.5)	23.3 (73.9)	20.2 (68.4)	15.0 (59.0)	11.3 (52.3)	17.1 (62.8)
Record low °C (°F)	1.5 (34.7)	−4.0 (24.8)	3.0 (37.4)	5.5 (41.9)	9.0 (48.2)	12.0 (53.6)	14.0 (57.2)	8.0 (46.4)	11.0 (51.8)	5.5 (41.9)	6.0 (42.8)	2.0 (35.6)	−4.0 (24.8)
Average precipitation mm (inches)	25.4 (1.00)	12.6 (0.50)	3.9 (0.15)	1.4 (0.06)	2.3 (0.09)	28.0 (1.10)	178.2 (7.02)	198.9 (7.83)	125.6 (4.94)	50.6 (1.99)	25.8 (1.02)	23.3 (0.92)	676.0 (26.61)
Average precipitation days (≥ 0.1 mm)	2.5	1.5	0.7	0.2	0.3	2.8	13.2	14.3	9.2	3.5	1.8	2.4	52.4
Source: Servicio Meteorologico Nacional

== Notable people ==
- Enrique Moreno Pérez (1877–1932), president of the Supreme Court of Justice of the Nation
- Héctor Luis Palma Salazar ("El Güero Palma", born 1960) drug trafficker who once worked with Joaquín "El Chapo" Guzmán
- Los Tigres del Norte, regional Mexican music group
- Octavio Paredes López (born 1946), biochemical engineer, president of the Mexican Academy of Sciences in 2004–2005
