= Course (music) =

String(s) on a string instrument played as a single string

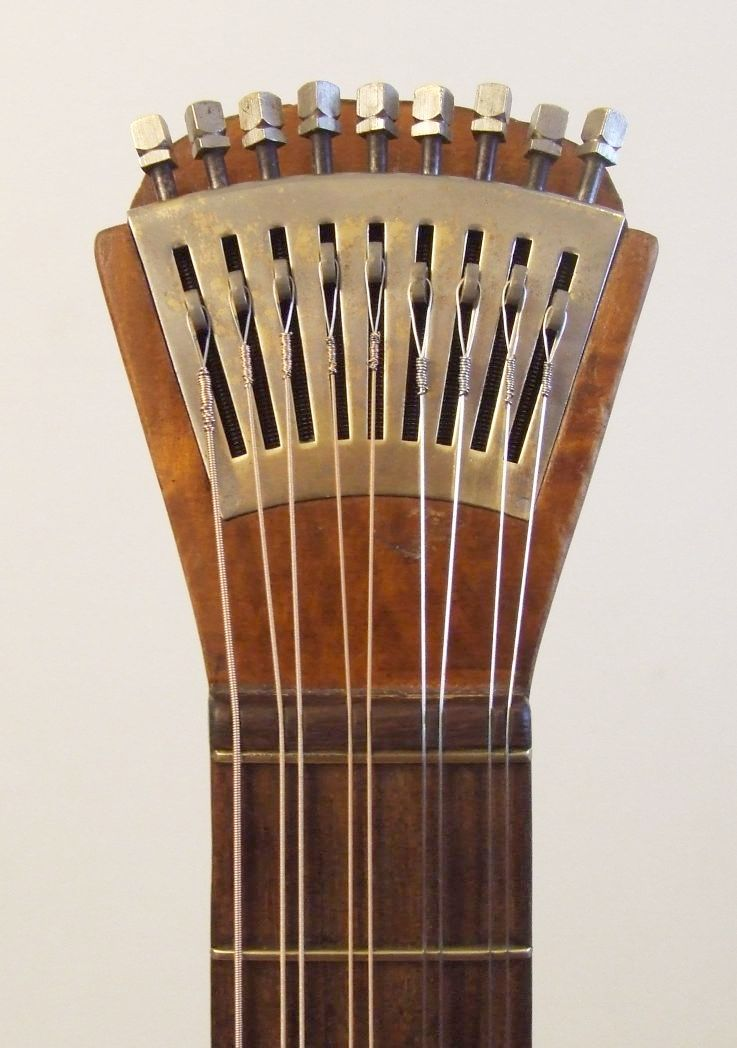
Waldzither courses

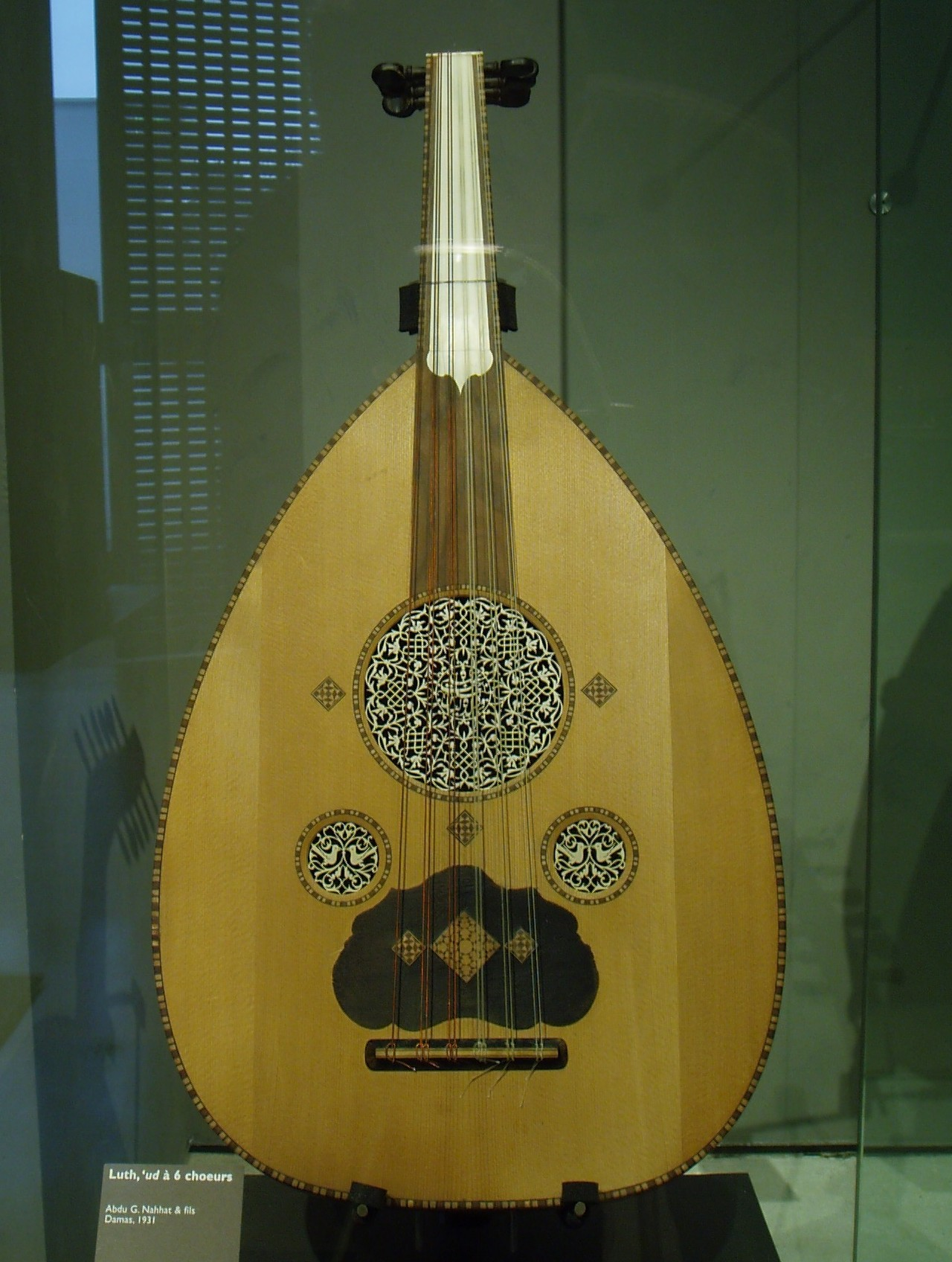
Oud courses

In organology, a course is either one string or two or more adjacent strings that are closely spaced relative to the other strings, and typically played as a single string. The strings in each multiple-string course are typically tuned in unison or an octave.

Normally, the term course is used to refer to a single string only on an instrument that also has multi-string courses. For example, a nine-string baroque guitar has five courses: most are two-string courses but sometimes the lowest or the highest consists of a single string.

An instrument with at least one multiple-string course is referred to as coursed, while one whose strings are all played individually is uncoursed.

== Rationale and types ==
Multiple string courses were probably originally employed to increase the volume of instruments, in eras in which electrical amplification did not exist, and stringed instruments might be expected to accompany louder instruments (such as woodwinds or brass). Eventually, however, they came to be employed to alter the timbral characteristics (the "tone") of instruments as well.

Strings within a multi-string course may both/all be tuned to the same pitch (e.g. mandolins); they may be tuned to the same pitch class but in different octaves (e.g. Tiple); or the strings may be tuned to different pitches, usually for special effect.

Examples of instruments that use two-string courses include:

- Saz
- Bajo quinto
- Bajo sexto
- Baroque guitar
- Bouzouki
- Charango family
- Chitarra battente
- Cittern
- Cimbalom
- Cümbüş
- Eight-string bass guitar
- Gittern
- Lute
- Mandolin family
- Mandore (instrument)
- Oud
- Piano
- Portuguese guitar family
- Springtime, a seven string guitar with three coursed strings
- Tar
- Tres
- Twelve-string guitar
- Vihuela
- Viola guitar

Examples of instruments that use three-string courses include:

- Saz
- Cimbalom
- Guitarrón chileno
- Mandriola
- Piano
- Tiple colombiano
- Twelve-string bass

Examples of instruments that use four- (or more) string courses include:

- Cimbalom
- Guitarrón chileno

As may be seen, some instruments contain courses with differing numbers of strings. A typical piano, for example, contains courses with one, two, and three strings, in different parts of its range.

== Mandolins ==
All members of the mandolin family, except some versions of the lowest-pitched, have courses each of two or three strings, most commonly eight strings in four courses.

The exception is some varieties of mando-bass, which have four individual strings.

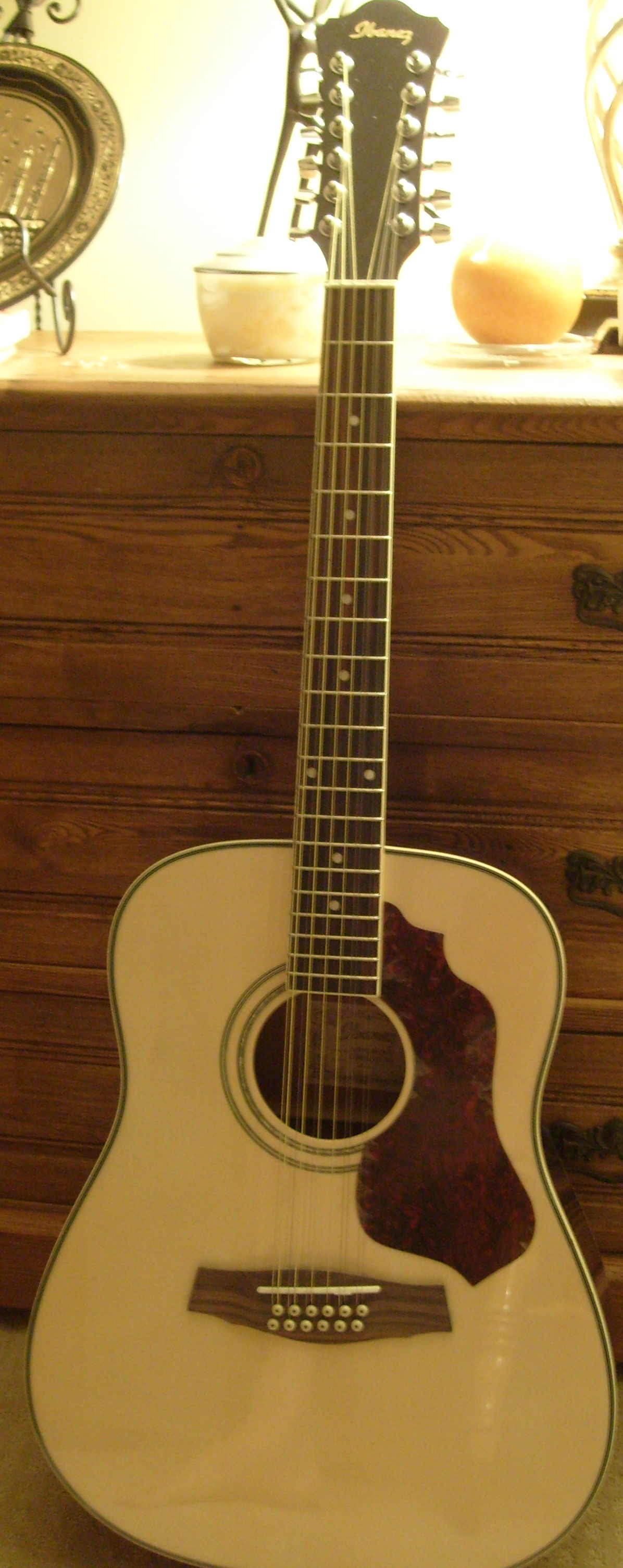
An acoustic 12-string guitar. The one shown here is an Ibanez instrument.

== Guitars ==
=== Baroque guitar ===
The baroque guitar has five courses, with the bottom four always double strung, and the top string (the "chanterelle") either double or single.

There are also several patterns of modern ten-string guitar but all have ten single strings, played individually.

=== Twelve-string guitar ===
The twelve-string guitar has twelve strings, in six courses. The courses are most often tuned E-A-D-G-B-E, similarly to a six-string guitar; however, older instruments were often tuned one tone lower D-G-C-F-A-D to reduce the tension on the neck, and commonly played with a capo on fret 2.

The lowest three courses (E-A-D) are normally tuned at octaves, with the primary string uppermost and the octave below it, while the upper two courses (B-E) are tuned to unison. The G course is either unison or at octaves.

On some electric twelve-string guitars, and most notably the Rickenbacker 360/12, the octave strings are below the primary strings.

== Tiple ==
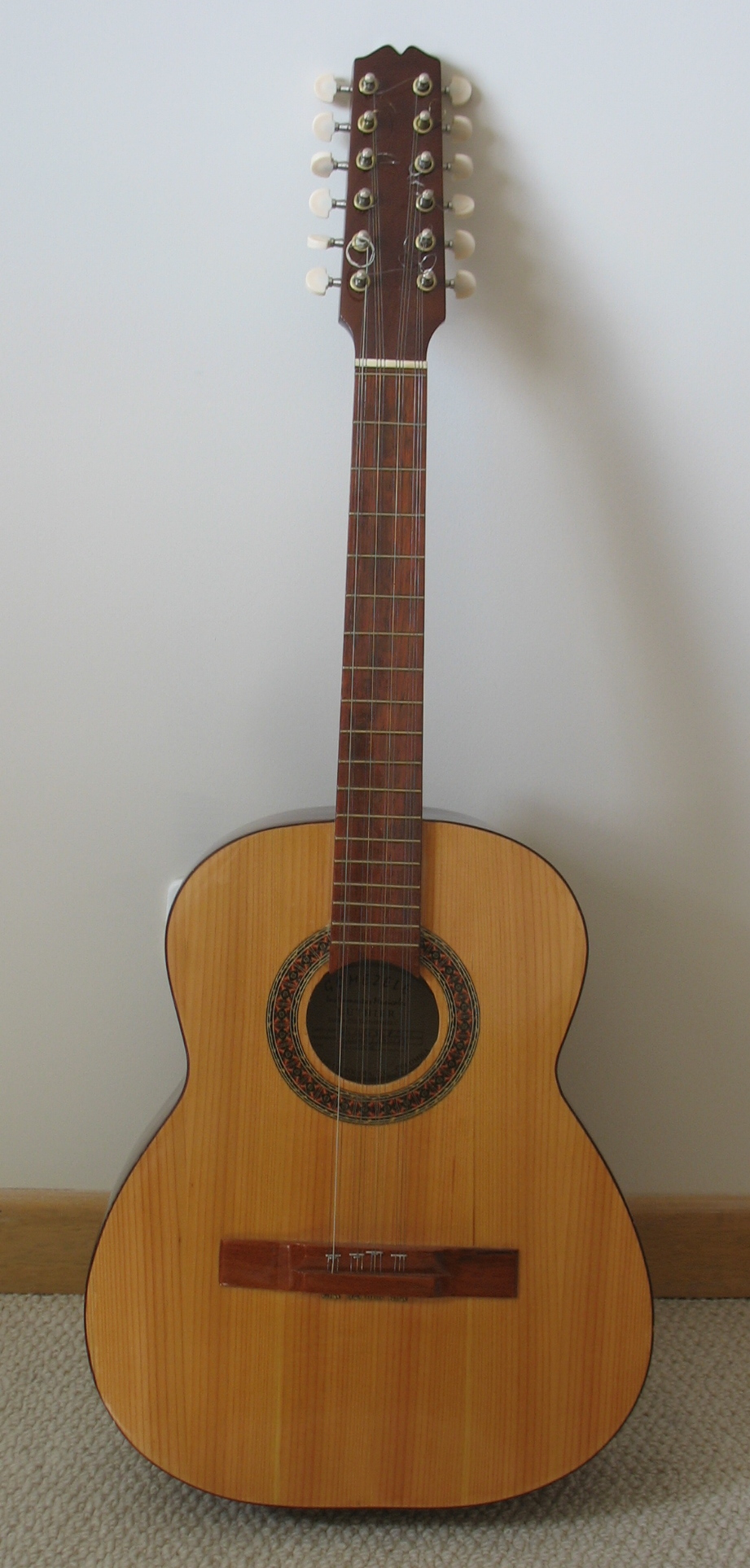
Tiple Colombiano

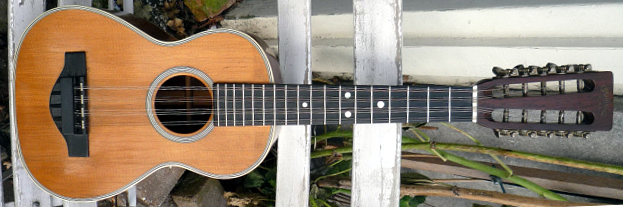
American tiple

The national instrument of Colombia, the tiple Colombiano, has four courses of three strings each. Its higher-pitched relative, the tiple requinto, is similarly triple-strung.

The American tiple, a smaller instrument loosely derived from the Colombian tiple, uses two double-strung courses and two triple-strung courses.

== Twelve-string bass ==
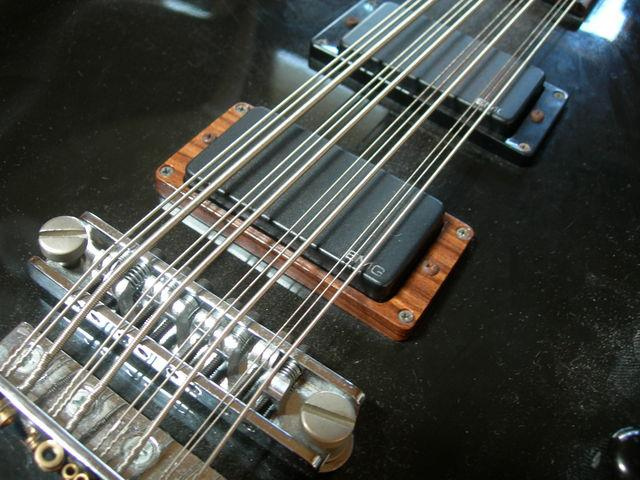
Detail of twelve string bass

The electric twelve-string bass has twelve strings in four triple courses. Basses have also been built with six double courses and other configurations but these are very rare.

== See also ==
- Drone (music)
