= Bajo quinto =

Mexican string instrument

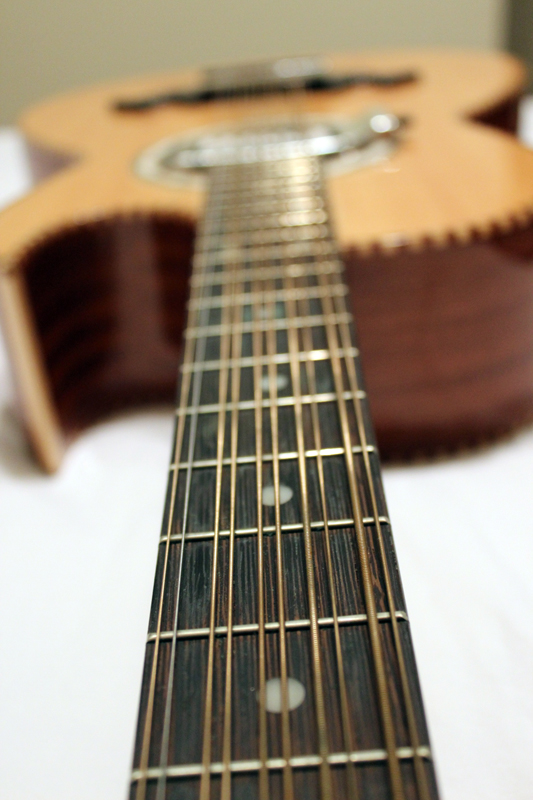
The fretboard and 10 strings of a bajo quinto

The Bajo quinto (Spanish: "fifth bass") is a Mexican string instrument from the guitar family with 10 strings in five double courses.

It is played in a similar manner to the guitar, with the left hand changing the pitch with the frets on a fingerboard while the right hand plucks or strums the strings with or without a pick. Its design was meant to accompany a bass guitarist and an accordion player, and taking turns with the latter leading melodic leads. This dynamic is a staple in regional Mexican styles. This is where it differs from its predecessor, the bajo sexto (Spanish: "sixth bass"), which has an additional lower pair of strings; 12 total (six double courses). It's worth noting that the introduction of bass players eventually led to many players no longer using the lowest pair of strings; which led to the bajo quinto's creation.

== Tuning ==
The Bajo Quinto is very similar in build to the guitar and has a much more familiar neck than the Bajo sexto as it's not as wide needing only 10 strings instead of 12. With the innovation of acoustic-electric pickup systems, the body is often similar in size to that of a guitar.

Since its predecessor the bajo sexto is tuned an octave below the guitar, the body on some instruments is not large enough for the lowest E to resonate well, and many players remove the sixth course, playing on only 10 strings (five courses). Many also preferred their instruments without the two lowest bass strings as they mainly focused on melodic leads. Luthiers eventually picked up on this practice and began leaving off the low E course during construction, producing instruments with only five courses — bajo quintos.

The Quinto is tuned in fourths — A, D, G, C, F. The A and D strings are doubled in octaves, with G, C, and F doubled in unison. The bajo quinto derives from the bajo sexto. Bajo quintos eliminate the low E course and are tuned as follows:

A2-A1 D3-D2 G2-G2 C3-C3 F3-F3 (from lowest to highest course, notwithstanding the first two pairs listed here as "highest to lowest".)

== Notable players ==
- Luis Hernández (Los Tigres del Norte)
- Ricardo Guzman JR (Ricardo Guzman JR y los tres aces)
- Ricardo Guzman IV (Ricky Guzman III)
