= Bajo sexto =

Mexican string instrument

Bajo sexto and bajo quinto
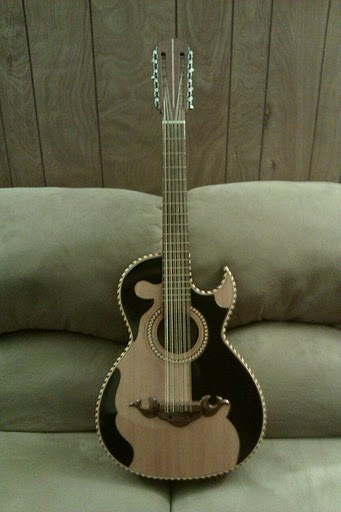
- A bajo sexto with a cutaway body

String instrument
- Classification: String instrument plucked with plectrum
- Hornbostel–Sachs classification: (Composite chordophone)

Related instruments
- lute, bandurria, banjo, mandolin, balalaika, tiple

The bajo sexto (Spanish: "sixth bass") is a Mexican string instrument from the guitar family with 12 strings in six double courses.

It is played in a similar manner to the guitar, with the left hand changing the pitch with the frets on a fingerboard while the right hand plucks or strums the strings with or without a pick. Its original design was meant to accompany accordion players (and fiddlers) and thus offer a plethora of possibilities with only two musicians. This dynamic is a staple in regional Mexican styles, even with groups consisting of multiple instruments. The introduction of bass players eventually led to many players no longer using the lowest pair of strings. For that reason, the bajo sexto predates its close relative, the bajo quinto (Spanish: "fifth bass"), which eliminated the lowest pair of strings and only has 10 (five double courses).

When played in older styles of music where the instrument assumes the role of a bass, the strings are usually plucked with the fingers. In modern chordal and melodic styles, a pick is frequently used.

== Origins and use ==
The history of the bajo sexto is characterized by its enigmatic origins. While limited historical documentation exists regarding its creation, compelling evidence suggests European influence. In particular, in the "mid-to-late 1800s", a German music store chain had branches throughout Mexico, including Oaxaca, part of a substantial migration of Germans to southern Texas during the 1830s and 1840s.

The musical styles and instruments of these German immigrants were embraced by Mexicans, who incorporated both into their own musical practices and traditions. Among the instruments that gained widespread popularity, the accordion emerged as one of the most influential. It found extensive use in dance music genres such as waltzes and polkas. The affordability of accordions made them accessible to a wide range of musicians, enabling them to explore Western music theory and develop their own interpretations of songs, ideal for solo performances.

While orchestras were popular in the early 19th century, they were far from common. The combination of accordions with bajo sextos introduced a versatile harmonic capability to folk musicians, allowing a simple duo to arrange and realize diverse styles of music, including popular songs which were previously the reserve of orchestras. The bajo sexto contributed a robust bass element, while establishing a firm rhythm that permitted the accordion to venture into intricate and lyrical melodic lines, often harmonized. This dynamic collaboration became a hallmark of Norteño music.

The addition of bass players provided bajo sexto players with opportunities to take turns leading melodic lines, enriching the texture of Mexican Norteño music. Many musicians relished the creative freedom afforded by bass players so much, they commissioned custom 10-string models, now recognized as the bajo quinto, which omitted the two lowest strings. This evolution underscores the adaptability and innovation within the realm of Mexican Norteño music. Norteño did not become a popular genre outside of the northern parts of Mexico until the 1950s. As groups began to record and perform for larger audiences, the style evolved as well.

The exact history of the bajo sexto is somewhat unclear. There are few written sources, and until very recently, most music dictionaries and encyclopedias did not mention the instrument. A few contemporary researchers have been working from oral sources—living players and luthiers—to trace the background of the instrument. They descend from the Spanish bandurrias and lutes that used double strings and were also tuned in fifths, perhaps to complete the harmonies in ensembles that required an instrument capable of giving the low notes of the harmonization of a melody.

In the 17th and 18th centuries, Mexican artisans built several types of instruments with double strings in three, four, five, six, seven and eight courses, influenced by their Spanish ancestors. Descendants of these instruments are bandolón, guitarra séptima, quinta huapanguera, jarana jarocha, concheras, and guitarra chamula, among others.

The manufacture of bajo quinto and sexto reached a peak in quality and popularity in the 19th century in central and southern Mexico, in the states of Guerrero, Michoacán, Morelos, Puebla, Oaxaca, and Tlaxcala.

Near the end of the 19th century the bajo sexto began to migrate northwards, where it became a popular instrument for weddings and dances such as the bailes de regalos (popular between 1870 and 1930). In these settings, it was usually played along with a set of small tom-tom drums.

The 1930s saw the rise of conjunto music and the instruments of choice for this developing style were accordion and bajo sexto. At this time the bajo sexto functioned primarily as a bass instrument, providing a strong rhythmic foundation supporting the solo accordion. In the late 1940s, string bass (and later, electric bass) was added to the instruments, and in the 1950s, drums, completing the modern conjunto ensemble. The inclusion of bass and drums freed the bajo sexto from exclusively rhythmic bass duties, and bajo players began experimenting with chords, counter rhythms, and melodic lines.

As the popularity of conjunto spread northward, the bajo sexto went with it, and the instrument was taken up by musicians in Northern Mexico and Texas to play other forms of music: norteño music of Northern Mexico and across the border in the music of South Texas known as "Tejano" (or Tex-Mex), "conjunto", or "música mexicana-tejana".

The Bajo Sexto is a Transposing instrument, it reads in Treble Clef but sounds 2 Octaves lower than written, thus Middle C sounds as C_{2}.

== Construction and tuning ==
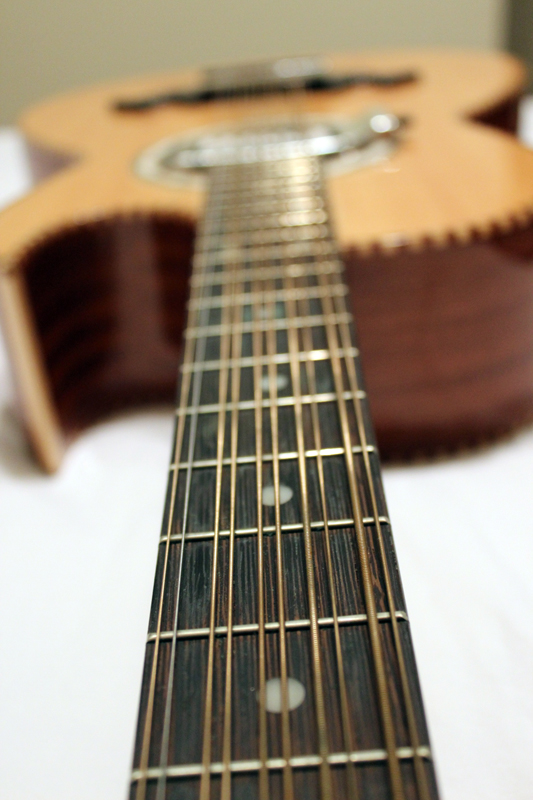
The fretboard and 10 strings of a bajo quinto

The bajo sexto is a member of the guitar family, and physically looks like a cross between a 12-string guitar and a cello because of its size. However, there are important differences: The body is usually a bit deeper; the neck is shorter, joining the body at the 12th fret (modern 12-string guitars usually join at the 14th fret); and (being a bass instrument) the strings are thicker. Older instruments tended to have a larger body; modern instruments are more guitar-like, and the body is typically not more than an inch or so deeper than the guitar. Modern instruments frequently have a cutaway in the upper bout of the body adjacent to the neck, allowing easier access to higher playing positions on the neck, for the left hand.

Since the instrument is tuned an octave below the regular guitar, the body on some instruments is not large enough for the lowest E to resonate well (in fact the bajo sexto is acoustically imperfect, just like the double bass, viola, and acoustic bass guitar), and many players remove the sixth course, playing on only 10 strings (five courses). Luthiers eventually picked up on this practice and began leaving off the low E course during construction, producing instruments with only five courses — bajo quintos. A lot of instruments have pickups installed inside the soundhole so that the low notes can be amplified electronically by plugging into the amp.

Bajo sextos are traditionally tuned in fourths, what a guitarist would call all fourths tuning (but it is a full octave down). The lower three courses are doubled at the higher octave (similar to the lower four courses on a 12-string guitar), and the upper three courses are doubled at the unison:

E2-E1 A2-A1 D3-D2 G2-G2 C3-C3 F3-F3 (from lowest to highest course)

There's also "Solo Tuning" (an octave below a regular guitar which matches the same pitch as a Bass VI) which allows the bajo sexto to play solo repertoire that was written for the violin sounding 2 octaves lower than written.

E2-E1 A2-A1 D3-D2 G2-G2 B2-B2 E3-E3

The bajo quinto derives from the bajo sexto. Bajo quintos eliminate the low E course and are tuned as follows:

A2-A1 D3-D2 G2-G2 C3-C3 F3-F3 (from lowest to highest course, notwithstanding the first two pairs listed here as "highest to lowest".)

== Customization ==
In the world of bajo music, the journey for aspiring musicians traditionally starts with a gift of their first stringed instrument from an experienced player. As they age and become seasoned players, it is customary for them to seek out a skilled luthier and commission instruments tailored to their unique playing styles and preferences. The evolution of the bajo quinto, for instance, was a direct result of such customizations. Many players sought instruments that omitted the lowest pair of strings, a modification made feasible by the introduction of bass players, granting them newfound freedom to explore melodious heights. This tradition of instrument customization finds its roots deep within the Mexican music tradition, underscoring the paramount value placed on personalized craftsmanship.

To attain the coveted status of a professional-grade bajo quinto or sexto, an instrument had to be meticulously handcrafted and customized. While each customization bore the stamp of individual preferences, several recurring elements emerged as emblematic of this artisanal craft:

- Inlay: Custom inlay on the fretboard or on the body was commonplace, alongside decorative binding.
- Cutaways: A cutaway design was introduced to maximize the fretboard's accessibility, enabling players to effortlessly reach the higher notes near the soundhole. This design innovation mirrored the preferences of future electric guitar players.
- Low Action: Low action, the distance between the strings and the fretboard, was a common preference among musicians. This feature facilitated smoother maneuverability across the fretboard, allowing for precision in playing techniques.
- Decorative Pickguards: In contrast to traditional guitars, pickguards on bajo sextos and quintos were not limited to the area around the strings. These ornate pickguards served both functional and aesthetic purposes, adorning the guitar's body in unique and striking ways.
- Bridge Designs: Bajo sextos and quintos often featured bridges with wide, curved designs that offered additional opportunities for decorative embellishments.

== Requinto-style setups for 12-string ==
In contrast to traditional 12-string counterparts, characterized by a configuration of six pairs of strings, most tuned an octave apart, requinto-style setups feature two sets of six strings. This configuration yields a resonant timbre reminiscent of the venerable bajo sexto.

Popular guitar manufacturers of 12-strings, including Takamine, Fender, Martin, and Ibanez, have emerged as favored canvases for crafting requinto-style instruments. The most popular option by far is Takamine, with its Takamine Signature artist model for John Jorgenson, commonly referred to as "el JJ" by players, being so sought after it is often sold out. In an interview with Takamine, Jorgenson learned the factory in Japan "couldn't build them fast enough". An iconic Regional Mexican style guitarist named Ariel Camacho used his signature 12-string with a requinto style set-up before he died young and many players favor his model in particular.

The traditional bajo sexto, engineered to endure high tension, differs markedly from the smaller and more modest physique of modern 12-string guitars, potentially ill-suited to such demands. To mitigate this excess tension, musicians employ various strategies, including:

- String Gauges: Using the lightest possible string gauges to minimize tension (e.g. Magma Ultra-Light Strings, 9, 11, 16, 26, 36, 46)
- 11 String set-up: Often utilizing a single E-string instead of the conventional two.
- Detuning and Capos: Employing detuning methods, either with or without capos on the first or second fret, to achieve open strings in the standard key.
- Bridge Reinforcements: Installing pressure posts, such as the JDL Bridge Doctor, beneath the bridge to prevent structural issues like bridge detachment, neck snapping, or belly warping. These pressure posts can be either screw-mounted or installed with brass pins, allowing horizontal string mounting, with the latter being recommended.

Customization remains a defining characteristic of these 12-string setups. Contemporary customizations encompass wrapping the guitar in a fashion reminiscent of automobile aesthetics. Altering pickguards, fitting specialized soundhole pick-ups, and adorning the instrument with artistic embellishments.
