= Rosa Valenzuela Rodelo =

Mexican politician

- Born: Sinaloa, Mexico
- Occupation: Politician
- Political party: PRI

Rosa Hilda Valenzuela Rodelo is a Mexican politician affiliated with the Institutional Revolutionary Party (PRI). In 2004–2006 she served in the Chamber of Deputies to represent Sinaloa's 3rd district during the 59th session of Congress as the alternate of Abraham Velázquez Iribe, who resigned his seat on 1 August 2004.
