= Alfonso Inzunza Montoya =

Mexican politician

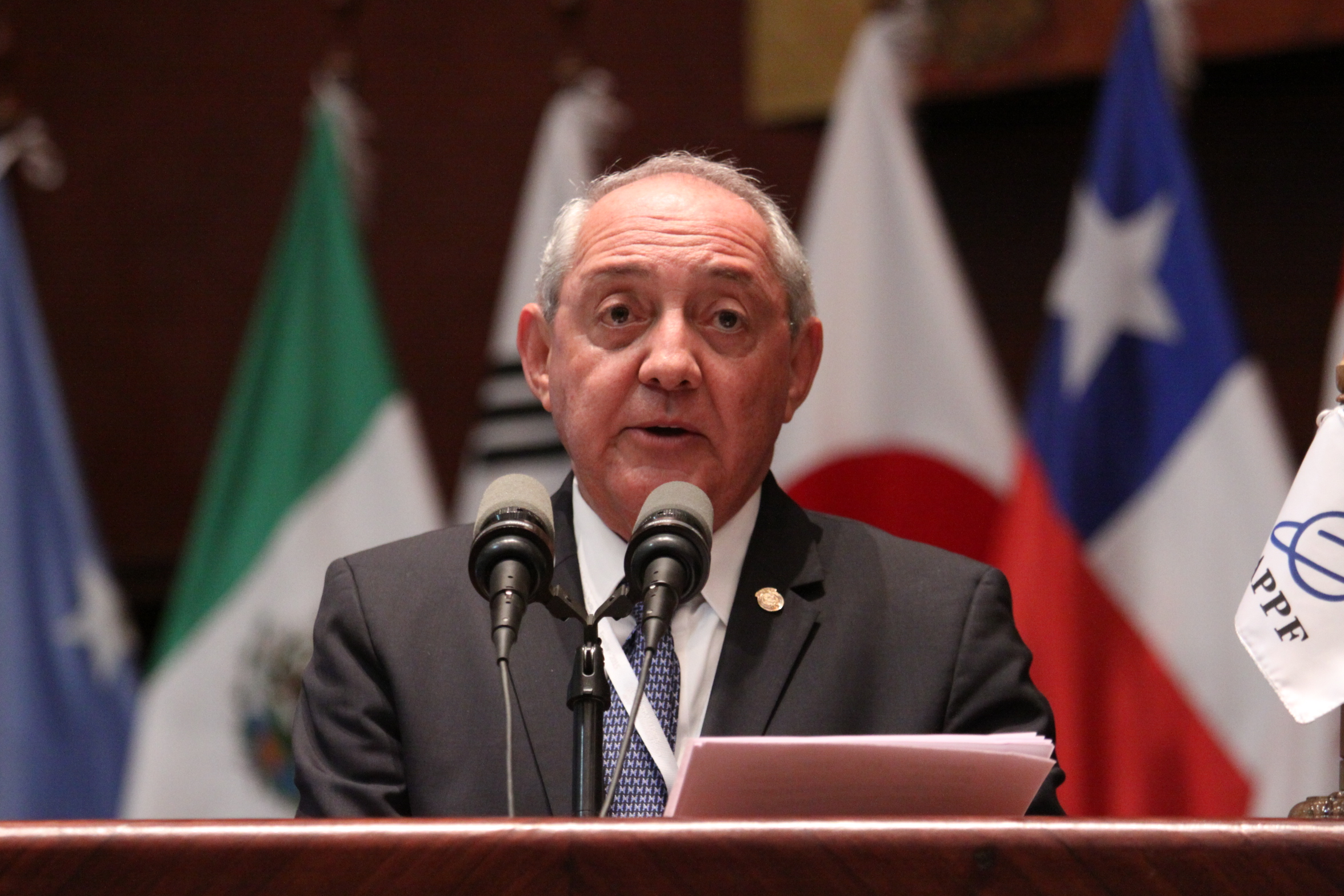
- Born: 14 November 1949 (age 76); Guamúchil, Sinaloa, Mexico
- Occupation: Politician
- Political party: PRI

Alfonso Inzunza Montoya (born 14 November 1949) is a Mexican politician affiliated with the Institutional Revolutionary Party (PRI). In the 2012 general election he was elected to the Chamber of Deputies to represent Sinaloa's 3rd district during the 62nd session of Congress.
