= Guitarra séptima =

Mexican guitar

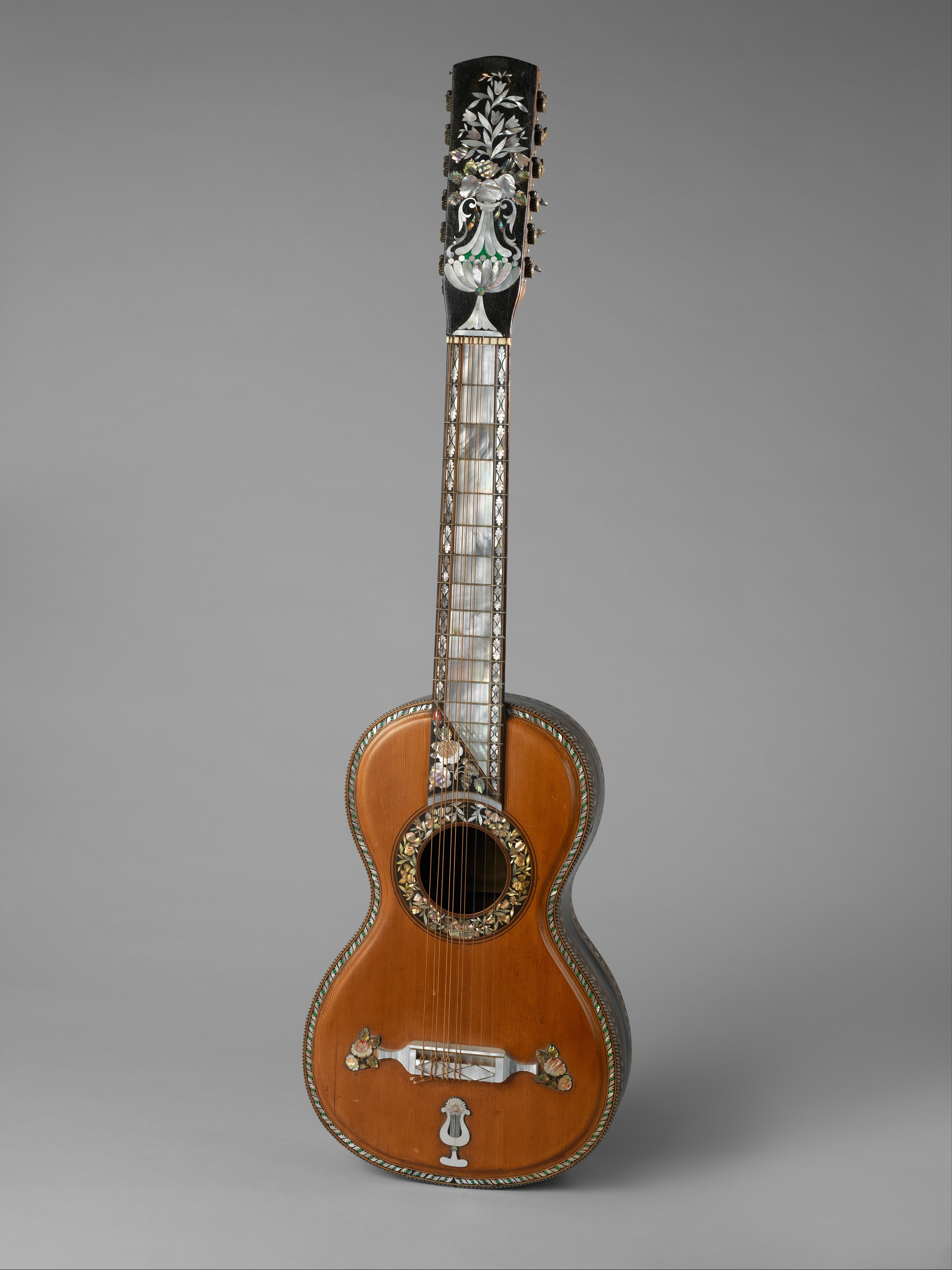
Guitarra séptima or 7-string guitar (Mexican tradition). Metropolitan Museum of Art.

The guitarra séptima or Mexican seven-course guitar is a historic variant of the Mexican guitar which reached its peak popularity in the 19th century. During the 19th century, Mexican composers created works for the instrument. The instrument fit a need in music, able to drop into low notes not attainable on a regular 6-string guitar.

While 7-string guitars exist elsewhere, Mexico developed its own tradition. The instrument can still be seen in southern Mexico in "mestizo ensembles" of "violin, mandolin and guitarra séptima." It was also associated with the Mexican typical orchestra.

The oldest reference to the instrument is found in the manuscript Explicación para tocar la guitarra de punteado por música o cifra, y reglas útiles para acompañar con ella la parte del bajo, (Explanation for playing the fingerpicked guitar by music or tablature, and useful rules for accompanying the bass part with it) by Juan Antonio de Vargas y Guzmán published in Veracruz in 1776.

Guzman was a classical guitarist born in Cádiz, Spain who settled in Veracruz, Mexico. Two variants of his manuscript have been found, one from 1773 and an expanded version in 1776.

== Details ==
The guitar was stung in 7 courses of strings. A course could be a single string or a pair of strings. The example in the Metropolitan Museum of Art has both kinds of courses, totaling 10 strings. Standard tuning was E, B, G, D, A, B. However, other tunings were used.
