= Régulo Caro =

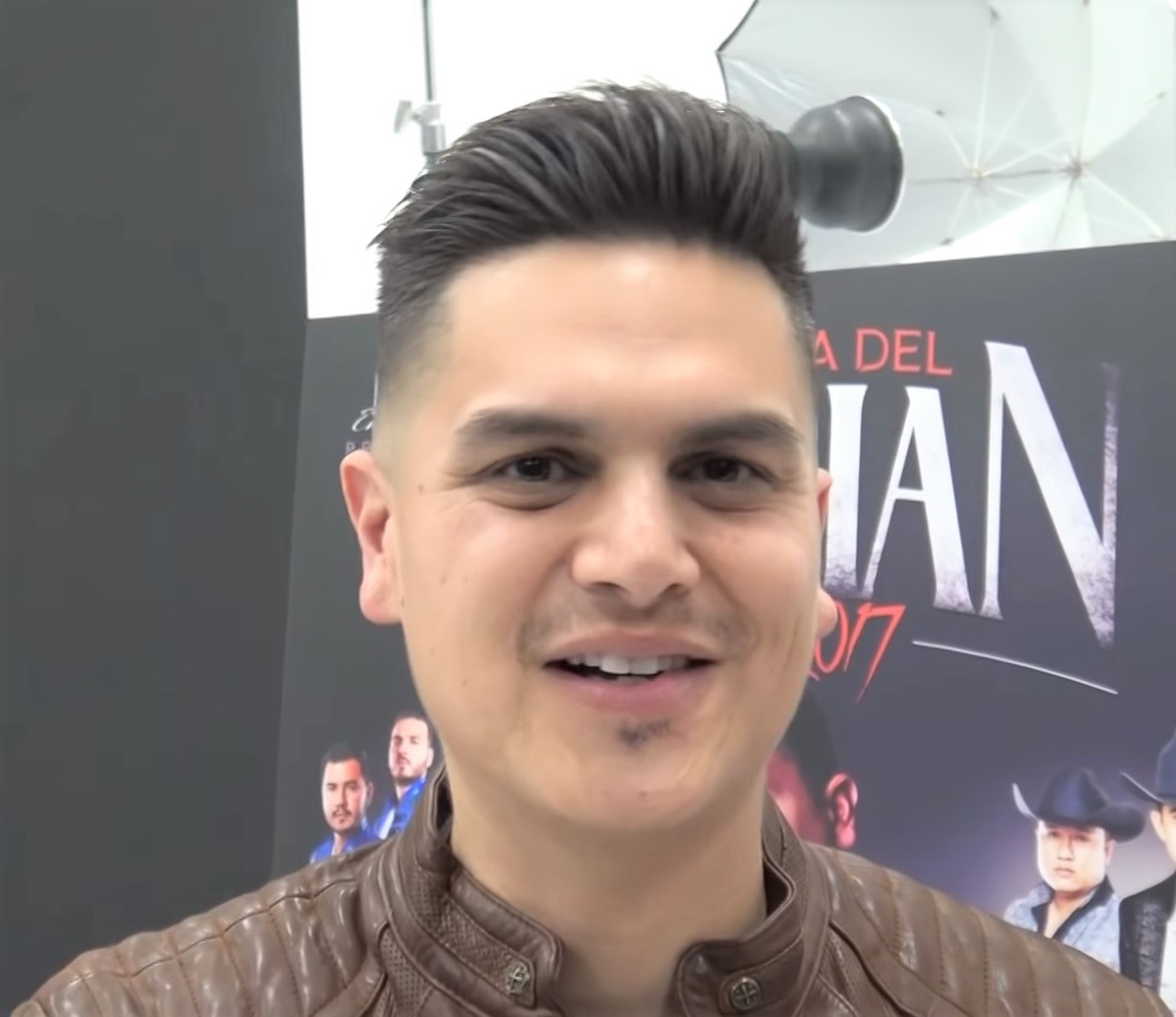
- Caro interviewed by Dulce Osuna in 2017

Background information
- Born: Régulo Caro; November 5, 1981 (age 44); Los Angeles , California, US
- Origin: Los Angeles, California, US
- Genre: Regional Mexican
- Occupation: Professional singer
- Instruments: Vocals; guitar
- Years active: 2010–present
- Label: Independent
- Website: regulocaro.net

Régulo Caro (born November 5, 1981) is a Mexican singer and songwriter.

== Biography ==
Caro was born and raised in Los Angeles, California, till the age of 7 and moved to Cuidad Obregón, then later returned to California for three additional years and then finished growing up in Ciudad Obregón, Sonora where later would meet his now wife Doris from mutual friends and now have two daughters and a son on the way due late 2024-2025. Descended from musicians, uncles and grandparents, since he was a small child, he showed his strong inclination towards music. At the age of 13, he decided to form a band. At 16, he had some experience at parties and meetings. He finished his bachelor's degree in business administration, which he only practiced for a few months, since his desire for music was latent. As a composer, he has worked with important exponents of regional Mexican music such as his cousin Gerardo Ortíz, Los Nuevos Rebeldes, Banda MS, Raúl Hernández, Los Buitres de Culiacán, and Alfredo Olivas.

Caro is one of the most popular artists of the regional Mexican genre and has received countless awards, including a Latin Grammy nomination, a BMI award, gold record, a star on the Las Vegas Walk of Stars, among others. His albums have positioned themselves in the Top 5 of the Regional Mexican Albums list of Billboard magazine and their songs have reached the first places of the lists of popularity.

== Discography ==
- Música, Pólvora y Sangre (December 17, 2010)
- Amor en Tiempos de Guerra (February 28, 2012)
- Especialista (August 27, 2013)
- Mi Guitarra y Yo Vol. 1 (July 29, 2014)
- Senzu-Rah (October 27, 2014)
- Mi Guitarra y Yo Vol. 2 (November 24, 2015)
- En Estos Dias (October 7, 2016)
- Mi Guitarra y Yo Vol. 3 (January 19, 2018)
- Emilio Garra (October 11, 2019)
- Mi Guitarra y Yo Vol. 4 (December 19, 2019)
- Regulo Caro vs. Emilio Garra (January 27, 2022)
- Desde los Sitios (En Vivo) (March 31, 2023)
- Mi Guitarra y Yo, Vol 5. (August 16, 2024)
- Carpe Diem (Full Experience) (August 8, 2025)

== Awards and nominations ==
The Latin Grammy Awards are awarded by the Latin Academy of Recording Arts and Sciences. Similar to the Grammy Award. Régulo Caro has received one nomination.

Year	Nominated works	Category	Award	Result
2012	Amor en Tiempos de Guerra	Best Norteño Album	Latin Grammy Awards	Nominated
