= Angostura Municipality, Sinaloa =

Municipality in the Mexican state of Sinaloa

Angostura Municipality Municipio de Angostura
- Municipality
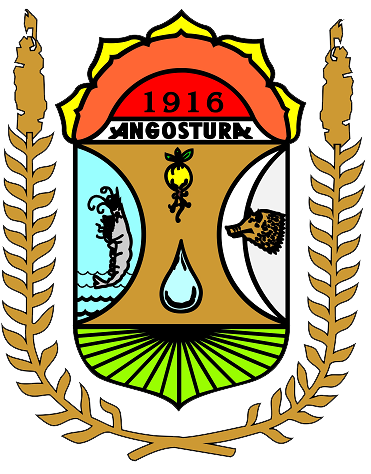
- Coat of arms

- Location of the municipality in Sinaloa
- Coordinates: 25°21′54″N 108°09′43″W
- Country: Mexico
- State: Sinaloa
- Seat: Angostura
- No. of Sindicaturas: 7
- Foundation: 1916

Government
  - Municipal president: José Manuel Valenzuela López

Area
  - Total: 1,447.63 km^{2} (558.93 sq mi)

Population (2010)
  - Total: 44,993
- Time zone: UTC-7 (Mountain Standard Time)
- Website: Official website

Angostura Municipality is a municipality in the Mexican state of Sinaloa in northwestern Mexico. Its seat is the city of Angostura.

It stands at 25°21′54″N 108°09′43″W.

According to 2010 census, it had a population of 44,993 inhabitants.

== Political subdivision ==
Angostura Municipality is subdivided in 7 sindicaturas:

- La Ilama
- Colonia Agrícola México
- Gato de Lara
- Alhuey
- Campo Plata
- La Reforma
- La Colonia Agrícola Independencia
