= Angostura, Sinaloa =

City in the Mexican state of Sinaloa

Angostura
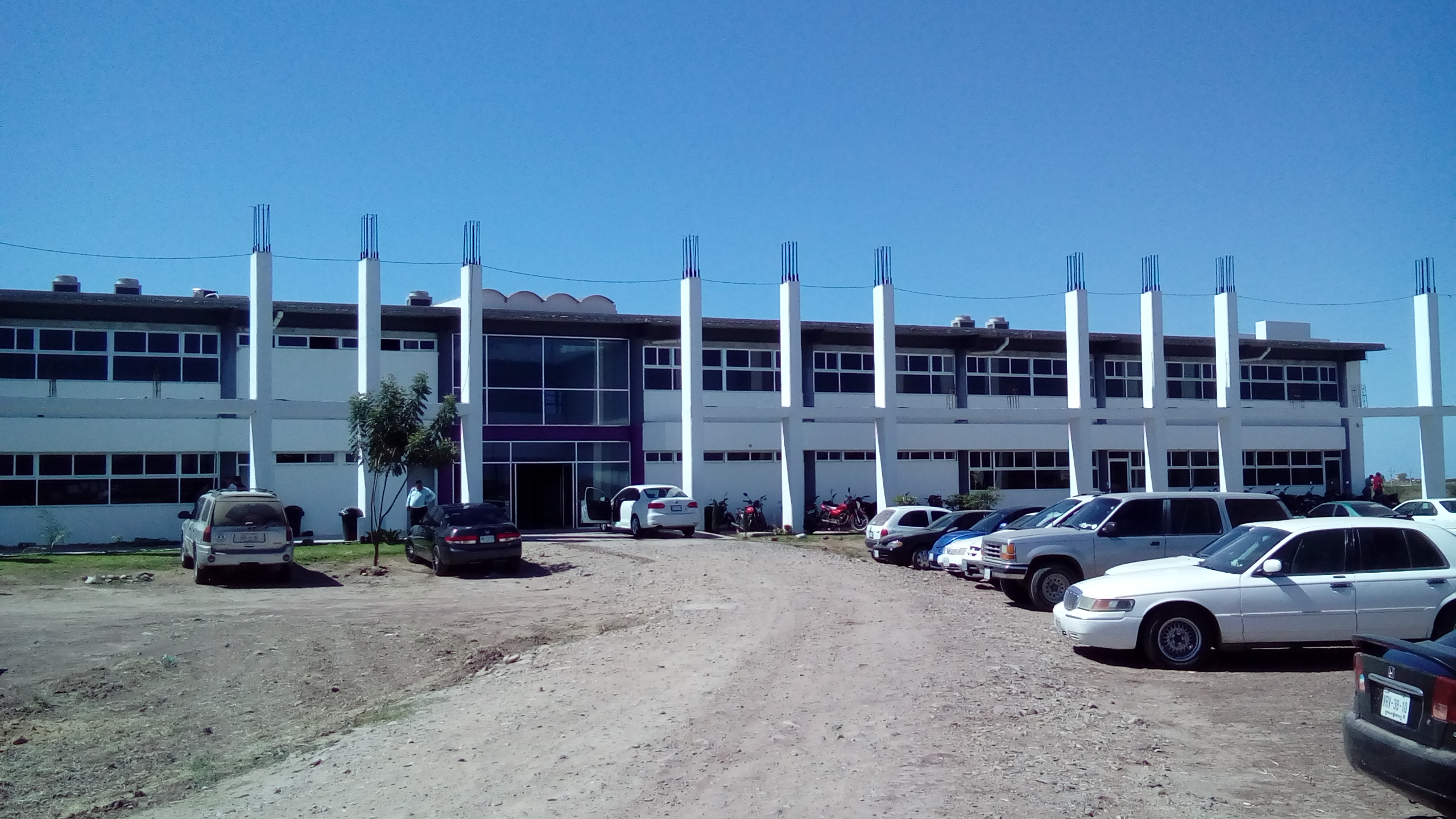

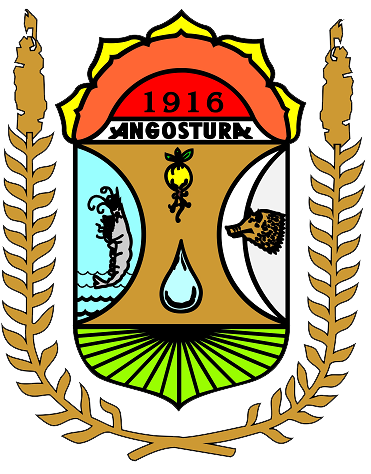
- Seal

- Location in Mexico
- Coordinates: 25°21′55″N 108°09′44″W
- Country: Mexico
- State: Sinaloa
- Municipality: Angostura

Government
  - Municipal president: José Manuel Valenzuela López

Population (2010)
  - Total: 5,086
- Time zone: UTC-7 (Mountain Standard Time)
- Website: Official website

Angostura is a city and it is seat of its surrounding municipality in the Mexican state of Sinaloa. It stands at 25°21′55″N 108°09′44″W.

The city of Angostura reported 5,086 inhabitants in the 2010 census.
