= 2012–13 Tercera División de México season =

Tercera División Profesional
- Season: 2012–13
- Dates: 31 August 2012 – 2 June 2013
- Champions: Poblado Miguel Alemán (1st title)
- Promoted: Poblado Miguel Alemán; Tecamachalco
- Stats are from the regular season only

The 2012–13 Tercera División season is the fourth-tier football league of Mexico. The tournament began on 31 August 2012 and finished on 2 June 2013.

== Competition format ==
The Tercera División (Third Division) is divided into 14 groups. For the 2009/2010 season, the format of the tournament has been reorganized to a home and away format, which all teams will play in their respective group. The 14 groups consist of teams who are eligible to play in the liguilla de ascenso for one promotion spot, teams who are affiliated with teams in the Liga MX, Ascenso MX and Liga Premier, which are not eligible for promotion but will play that who the better filial team in an eight team filial playoff tournament for the entire season.

The league format allows participating franchises to rent their place to another team, so some clubs compete with a different name than the one registered with the FMF.

== Group 1 ==
Group with 9 teams from Campeche, Chiapas, Quintana Roo, Tabasco and Yucatán.

Location of teams in the 2012–13 3ra División Group 1 (Carmen (Campeche), Chiapas and Tabasco)
Location of teams in the 2012–13 3ra División Group 1 (Quintana Roo)
Location of teams in the 2012–13 3ra División Group 1 (Campeche City and Yucatán)

=== Teams ===
Team	City	Home ground	Capacity	Affiliate	Official name
Chetumal	Chetumal, Quintana Roo	10 de Abril	5,000	—	—
Corsarios de Campeche	Campeche, Campeche	Universitario de Campeche	4,000	—	—
Delfines del Carmen	Ciudad del Carmen, Campeche	Polideportivo UNACAR Campus II	8,000	Delfines	–
Dragones de Tabasco	Villahermosa, Tabasco	Olímpico de Villahermosa	10,500	—	Real Victoria
Ejidatarios de Bonfil	Cancún, Quintana Roo	La Parcela	1,000	—	—
Inter Playa del Carmen	Playa del Carmen, Quintana Roo	Unidad Deportiva Félix González Canto	1,000	Inter Playa del Carmen	—
Itzaes	Mérida, Yucatán	Unidad Deportiva Solidaridad	1,000	–	–
Jaguares de la 48	Reforma, Chiapas	Sergio Lira Gallardo	600	—	—
Pioneros Junior	Cancún, Quintana Roo	Cancún 86	6,390	Pioneros de Cancún	—

=== League table ===
Pos	Team	Pld	W	D	L	GF	GA	GD	BP	Pts	Qualification or relegation
1	Corsarios de Campeche	16	11	4	1	38	12	+26	1	38	Promotion play-offs
2	Chetumal	16	10	4	2	29	7	+22	3	37	Promotion play-offs
3	Jaguares de la 48	16	7	7	2	21	9	+12	4	32	Promotion play-offs
4	Inter Playa del Carmen	16	5	5	6	19	17	+2	5	25	Promotion play-offs
5	Pioneros Junior	16	4	8	4	19	22	−3	2	22	
6	Ejidatarios de Bonfil	16	5	5	6	17	24	−7	1	21	
7	Delfines del Carmen	16	3	6	7	16	26	−10	3	18	
8	Dragones de Tabasco	16	1	6	9	9	28	−19	4	13	
9	Itzaes	16	2	3	11	11	34	−23	1	10	

Source: Tercera División

== Group 2 ==
Group with 16 teams from Chiapas, Oaxaca and Veracruz.

=== Teams ===
Location of teams in the 2012–13 3ra División Group 2 (Chiapas, Oaxaca and Southern Veracruz)
Location of teams in the 2012–13 3ra División Group 2 (Northern and Central Veraruz)

Team	City	Home ground	Capacity	Affiliate	Official Name
Académicos UGM	Orizaba, Veracruz	Universitario UGM	1,500	–	–
Atlético Boca del Río	Boca del Río, Veracruz	Unidad Deportiva Hugo Sánchez	1,500	—	–
Caballeros de Córdoba	Córdoba, Veracruz	Rafael Murillo Vidal	3,800	–	–
Cruz Azul Lagunas	Lagunas, Oaxaca	Cruz Azul	2,000	Cruz Azul	–
Delfines UGM	Nogales, Veracruz	UGM Nogales	1,500	—	—
Estudiantes de Xalapa	Xalapa, Veracruz	Antonio M. Quirasco	3,000	–	–
Estudiantes de San Andrés	San Andrés Tuxtla, Veracruz	Unidad Deportiva Lino Fararoni	1,000	—	–
Halcones Marinos de Veracruz	Boca del Río, Veracruz	Universidad Cristóbal Colón	1,200	—	–
Lanceros de Cosoleacaque	Cosoleacaque, Veracruz	Unidad Deportiva Miguel Hidalgo	1,000	–	–
Langostineros de Atoyac	Atoyac, Veracruz	Padelma 2000	1,000	–	–
Limoneros de Martínez de la Torre	Martínez de la Torre, Veracruz	El Cañizo	3,000	–	–
Naranjeros de Álamo	Juchitán de Zaragoza, Oaxaca	Municipal Juchiteco	1,000	–	–
Petroleros de Poza Rica	Poza Rica, Veracruz	Heriberto Jara Corona	10,000	—	—
Piñeros de Loma Bonita	Loma Bonita, Oaxaca	20 de Noviembre	1,000	–	–
Tiburones Rojos Boca del Río	Boca del Río, Veracruz	CAR Veracruz	1,000	Veracruz	–

=== League table ===
Pos	Team	Pld	W	D	L	GF	GA	GD	BP	Pts	Qualification or relegation
1	Tiburones Rojos Boca del Río	30	21	4	5	80	20	+60	4	71	Reserve Teams play-offs
2	Langostineros de Atoyac	30	22	3	5	53	23	+30	0	69	Promotion play-offs
3	Petroleros de Poza Rica	30	19	4	7	60	26	+34	3	64	Promotion play-offs
4	Cruz Azul Lagunas	30	18	5	7	71	35	+36	2	61	Promotion play-offs
5	Estudiantes de San Andrés	30	17	7	6	75	37	+38	2	60	Promotion play-offs
6	Piñeros de Loma Bonita	30	13	7	10	54	50	+4	4	50	
7	Lanceros de Cosoleacaque	30	13	6	11	50	51	−1	5	50	
8	Académicos UGM	30	13	5	12	51	40	+11	2	46	
9	Atlético Boca del Río	30	11	9	10	38	44	−6	3	45	
10	Estudiantes de Xalapa	30	10	6	14	36	46	−10	4	40	
11	Naranjeros de Álamo	30	10	5	15	45	57	−12	1	36	
12	Limoneros de Martínez de la Torre	30	11	1	18	42	65	−23	0	34	
13	Halcones Marinos de Veracruz	30	7	5	18	42	65	−23	2	28	
14	Delfines UGM	30	5	6	19	43	79	−36	4	25	
15	Caballeros de Córdoba	30	5	3	22	24	73	−49	3	21	
16	Héroes de Veracruz	30	6	2	22	24	77	−53	0	20	

Source: Tercera División

== Group 3 ==
Group with 17 teams from Guerrero, Morelos, Oaxaca, Puebla, State of Mexico and Veracruz.

=== Teams ===
Location of teams in the 2012–13 3ra División Group 6 (Morelos)
Location of teams in the 2012–13 3ra División Group 6 (Guerrero)
Location of teams in the 2012–13 3ra División Group 6 (Puebla and Veracruz)
Location of teams in the 2012–13 3ra División Group 3 (Oaxaca and State of Mexico)

Team	City	Home ground	Capacity	Affiliate	Official name
Albinegros de Orizaba	Orizaba, Veracruz	EMSA	1,500	–	–
Alpha	Puebla City, Puebla	Club Alpha 3	3,000	–	–
Anlesjeroka	Tehuacán, Puebla	Anlesjeroka	400	Guadalajara	–
Atlético Cuernavaca	Cuernavaca, Morelos	Municipal Mazatepec	1,000	–	–
Aztecas AMF Soccer	Zacapoaxtla, Puebla	Polideportivo Zacapoaxtla	1,000	–	–
Ballenas Galeana Morelos	Xochitepec, Morelos	La Escuelita	1,000	–	–
Chapulineros de Oaxaca	Oaxaca City, Oaxaca	Unidad Deportiva Oriente	1,000	–	–
Chilpancingo	Chilpancingo, Guerrero	Polideportivo Chilpancingo	1,000	–	–
Cuautla UNILA	Cuautla, Morelos	Isidro Gil Tapia	5,000	Cuautla	–
Deportivo Neza	Tierra Colorada, Guerrero	Unidad Deportiva La Pinta	1,000	–	–
Guerreros de Yecapixtla	Yecapixtla, Morelos	Fidel Díaz Vera	1,000	–	–
SEP Puebla	Puebla City, Puebla	Unidad Deportiva Mario Vázquez Raña	800	–	–
Tehuacán	Tehuacán, Puebla	Tehuacán	1,000	–	–
Tigrillos Dorados MRCI	San Jerónimo Tlacochahuaya, Oaxaca	Campo Independiente MRCI	3,000	–	–
Tulyehualco	Puebla City, Puebla	Ex Hacienda San José Maravillas	500	–	–
Zacatepec 1948	Zacatepec, Morelos	Agustín Coruco Díaz	16,000	Zacatepec 1948	–
Zapata	Xochitepec, Morelos	Unidad Deportiva Tehuixtla	1,000	–	–

=== League table ===
Pos	Team	Pld	W	D	L	GF	GA	GD	BP	Pts	Qualification or relegation
1	Ballenas Galeana Morelos	32	23	6	3	100	24	+76	2	77	Promotion play-offs
2	Chilpancingo	32	17	10	5	95	36	+59	10	71	Promotion play-offs
3	Alpha	32	20	6	6	102	24	+78	2	68	Promotion play-offs
4	Zacatepec 1948	32	18	8	6	87	25	+62	4	66	Promotion play-offs
5	Guerreros de Yecapixtla	32	18	6	8	76	37	+39	1	61	Promotion play-offs
6	Cuautla UNILA	32	18	6	8	74	43	+31	1	61	
7	Tigrillos Dorados MRCI	32	16	7	9	57	36	+21	3	58	
8	Chapulineros de Oaxaca	32	14	7	11	51	36	+15	5	54	
9	Anlesjeroka	32	13	9	10	54	51	+3	4	52	
10	Albinegros de Orizaba	32	12	7	13	50	52	−2	4	47	
11	Tulyehualco	32	12	7	13	62	62	0	3	46	
12	SEP Puebla	32	11	8	13	64	53	+11	4	45	
13	Atlético Cuernavaca	32	9	3	20	47	97	−50	1	31	
14	Tehuacán	32	7	5	20	40	93	−53	4	30	
15	Aztecas AMF Soccer	32	4	7	21	29	108	−79	3	22	
16	Zapata	32	4	5	23	29	101	−72	2	19	
17	Deportivo Neza	32	2	1	29	24	163	−139	0	7	

Source: Tercera División

== Group 4 ==
Group with 17 teams from Greater Mexico City.

=== Teams ===
Location of teams in the 2012–13 3ra División Group 4 (Greater Mexico City urban area)
Location of teams in the 2012–13 3ra División Group 4 (Greater Mexico City rural area)

Team	City	Home ground	Capacity	Affiliate	Official name
Águilas de Teotihuacán	Teotihuacán, State of Mexico	Municipal Acolman	1,000	–	–
Álamos	Venustiano Carranza, Mexico City	Magdalena Mixhuca Sports City	500	–	–
Ángeles de la Ciudad	Iztacalco, Mexico City	Jesús Martínez "Palillo"	6,000	–	–
Atlético Herba	Tlahuac, Mexico City	Universidad Tlahuac	500	–	–
Azules de la Sección 26	Gustavo A. Madero, Mexico City	Deportivo Francisco Zarco	500	Pachuca	–
Coyotes Neza	Ciudad Nezahualcóyotl, State of Mexico	Metropolitano	4,000	–	–
Deportivo Iztacalco	Chapa de Mota, State of Mexico	Unidad Deportiva Chapa de Mota	1,000	–	–
Lobos Unión Neza	Ciudad Nezahualcóyotl, State of Mexico	Deportivo Francisco I. Madero	2,000	–	–
Marina	Xochimilco, Mexico City	Valentín González	5,000	–	–
Novillos Neza	Ciudad Nezahualcóyotl, State of Mexico	Metropolitano	4,000	–	–
Pato Baeza	Texcoco de Mora, State of Mexico	Centro de Fútbol Pato Baeza	1,000	–	–
Promodep Central	Venustiano Carranza, Mexico City, Venustiano Carranza	Deportivo Plutarco Elías Calles	2,500	–	–
Real Olmeca Sport	Iztacalco, Mexico City	Magdalena Mixhuca Sports City	500	–	–
Sporting Canamy	Iztapalapa, Mexico City	Deportivo Francisco I. Madero	2,000	–	–
Tecamachalco Sur	Huixquilucan de Degollado, State of Mexico	Alberto Pérez Navarro	3,000	–	Ajax Jiutepec
Texcoco	Texcoco de Mora, State of Mexico	Municipal Claudio Suárez	4,000	–	–
Vaqueros	Tepotzotlán, State of Mexico	Municipal Miguel Alemán	1,000	–	–

=== League table ===
Pos	Team	Pld	W	D	L	GF	GA	GD	BP	Pts	Qualification or relegation
1	Tecamachalco Sur	32	21	7	4	105	38	+67	4	74	Promotion play-offs
2	Marina	32	21	5	6	77	34	+43	4	72	Promotion play-offs
3	Ángeles de la Ciudad	32	20	6	6	73	25	+48	2	68	Promotion play-offs
4	Coyotes Neza	32	17	9	6	79	35	+44	5	65	Promotion play-offs
5	Sporting Canamy	32	16	10	6	81	31	+50	6	64	Promotion play-offs
6	Azules de la Sección 26	32	18	6	8	89	41	+48	4	64	
7	Pato Baeza	32	17	7	8	67	29	+38	4	62	
8	Álamos	32	19	3	10	79	50	+29	1	61	
9	Real Olmeca Sport	32	15	3	14	56	44	+12	1	49	
10	Lobos Unión Neza	32	13	5	14	72	66	+6	2	46	
11	Promodep Central	32	10	8	14	47	61	−14	3	41	
12	Texcoco	32	10	7	15	57	55	+2	3	40	
13	Deportivo Iztacalco	32	9	6	17	47	77	−30	3	36	
14	Águilas de Teotihuacán	32	8	2	22	39	94	−55	1	27	
15	Novillos Neza	32	6	2	24	33	109	−76	0	20	
16	Atlético Herba	32	4	4	24	47	132	−85	2	18	
17	Vaqueros	32	2	2	28	20	147	−127	1	9	

Source: Tercera División

== Group 5 ==
Group with 16 teams from Mexico City, Michoacán and State of Mexico.

Location of teams in the 2012–13 3ra División Group 5

=== Teams ===
Team	City	Home ground	Capacity	Affiliate	Official name
Atlético Chiapas	Iztacalco, Mexico City	Magdalena Mixhuca Sports City	500	–	–
Atlético Naucalpan	Naucalpan, State of Mexico	Unidad Cuauhtémoc	1,500	–	–
Atlético UEFA	Coacalco, State of Mexico	Campos Fragoso	500	–	–
Estudiantes de Atlacomulco	Atlacomulco, State of Mexico	Ignacio Pichardo Pagaza	2,000	–	–
Futcenter	Tlalnepantla de Baz, State of Mexico	Deportivo Luis García Postigo	1,000	–	–
Grupo Sherwood	Ixtapan de la Sal, State of Mexico	Ixtapan 90	4,000	–	–
Ixtlahuaca	Ixtlahuaca, State of Mexico	Municipal	2,000	–	–
Jilotepec	Jilotepec, State of Mexico	Rubén Chávez Chávez	2,000	–	–
Manchester Metepec	Metepec, State of Mexico	Unidad Cultural SNTE	500	–	–
Metepec	Metepec, State of Mexico	Cancha Arqueros FC	1,000	–	–
Potros UAEM	Toluca, State of Mexico	Alberto "Chivo" Córdoba	32,603	Potros UAEM	–
Real Halcones	Atizapán de Zaragoza, State of Mexico	Deportivo Ana Gabriela Guevara	2,500	–	–
Tejupilco	Tejupilco, State of Mexico	Unidad Deportiva Tejupilco	1,000	–	–
Tecamachalco	Huixquilucan de Degollado, State of Mexico	Alberto Pérez Navarro	3,000	–	–
Tolcayuca	Atlautla, State of Mexico	La Granja	1,500	–	–
Zitácuaro	Zitácuaro, Michoacán	Ignacio López Rayón	10,000	–	–

=== League table ===
Pos	Team	Pld	W	D	L	GF	GA	GD	BP	Pts	Qualification or relegation
1	Zitácuaro	30	25	4	1	84	25	+59	1	80	Promotion play-offs
2	Potros UAEM	30	24	4	2	122	18	+104	3	79	Promotion play-offs
3	Tecamachalco	30	24	3	3	127	16	+111	0	75	Promotion play-offs
4	Estudiantes de Atlacomulco	30	20	5	5	110	26	+84	4	69	Promotion play-offs
5	Tejupilco	30	20	4	6	76	24	+52	2	66	Promotion play-offs
6	Manchester Metepec	30	16	5	9	57	32	+25	3	56	
7	Real Halcones	30	12	6	12	56	49	+7	2	44	
8	Futcenter	30	11	6	13	56	54	+2	4	43	
9	Atlético Naucalpan	30	11	4	15	55	49	+6	2	39	
10	Metepec	30	7	10	13	43	45	−2	8	39	
11	Ixtlahuaca	30	10	6	14	56	66	−10	3	39	
12	Jilotepec	30	6	9	15	34	68	−34	4	31	
13	Atlético UEFA	30	6	3	21	35	80	−45	1	22	
14	Grupo Sherwood	30	4	6	20	31	67	−36	2	20	
15	Atlético Chiapas	30	3	4	23	25	104	−79	0	13	
16	Tolcayuca	30	1	1	28	11	255	−244	1	5	

Source: Tercera División

== Group 6 ==
Group with 16 teams from Hidalgo, Puebla, San Luis Potosí, State of Mexico and Tlaxcala.

=== Teams ===
Location of teams in the 2012–13 3ra División Group 6 (Hidalgo, State of Mexico and SLP)
Location of teams in the 2012–13 3ra División Group 6 (Puebla and Tlaxcala)

Team	City	Home ground	Capacity	Affiliate	Official name
Atlético Hidalgo	Pachuca, Hidalgo	La Higa	1,000	–	–
Cruz Azul Dublán	Ciudad Cooperativa Cruz Azul, Hidalgo	Estadio 10 de Diciembre	17,000	Cruz Azul	–
Deportivo Ixmiquilpan	Ixmiquilpan, Hidalgo	Unidad Deportiva Ixmiquilpan	1,000	–	Plateados de Cerro Azul
Hidalguense	Pachuca, Hidalgo	Club Hidalguense	800	–	–
Leones de Huauchinango	Huauchinango, Puebla	Unidad Deportiva México	1,000	–	–
Lobos BUAP	Puebla City, Puebla	Preparatoria Benito Juárez	1,500	Lobos BUAP	–
Morelos Ecatepec	Ecatepec, State of Mexico	Morelos	2,000	–	–
Pachuca Juniors	San Agustín Tlaxiaca, Hidalgo	Universidad del Fútbol	1,000	Pachuca	–
Reales de Puebla	Atlixco, Puebla	Deportivo Metepec	1,000	—	—
Real San Cosme	Mazatecocho, Tlaxcala	San José del Agua	1,000	–	–
Santiago Tulantepec	Santiago Tulantepec, Hidalgo	Unidad Deportiva Conrado Muntane	1,000	–	–
Star Club	Chiautempan, Tlaxcala	Unidad Deportiva Próspero Cahuantzi	2,500	—	—
Sultanes de Tamazunchale	Tamazunchale, San Luis Potosí	Deportivo Solidaridad	1,650	—	—
Tuzos Pachuca	San Agustín Tlaxiaca, Hidalgo	Universidad del Fútbol	1,000	Pachuca	–
Unión Acolman	Acolman, State of Mexico	Municipal Acolman	1,200	–	–
Universidad del Fútbol	San Agustín Tlaxiaca, Hidalgo	Universidad del Fútbol	1,000	Pachuca	–

=== League table ===
Pos	Team	Pld	W	D	L	GF	GA	GD	BP	Pts	Qualification or relegation
1	Cruz Azul Dublán	30	22	6	2	101	20	+81	5	77	Reserve Teams play-offs
2	Tuzos Pachuca	30	25	0	5	124	29	+95	0	75	Promotion play-offs
3	Star Club	30	22	2	6	84	30	+54	2	70	Promotion play-offs
4	Santiago Tulantepec	30	18	4	8	62	40	+22	1	59	Promotion play-offs
5	Lobos BUAP	30	18	2	10	56	36	+20	2	58	Promotion play-offs
6	Sultanes de Tamazunchale	30	19	0	11	68	35	+33	0	57	
7	Universidad del Fútbol	30	16	4	10	63	61	+2	1	53	
8	Morelos Ecatepec	30	13	7	10	46	36	+10	2	48	
9	Hidalguense	30	13	8	9	51	46	+5	1	48	
10	Deportivo Ixmiquilpan	30	8	7	15	43	48	−5	5	36	
11	Leones de Huauchinango	30	7	8	15	46	62	−16	4	33	
12	Reales de Puebla	30	8	4	18	45	92	−47	3	31	
13	Pachuca Juniors	30	5	6	19	22	58	−36	2	23	
14	Atlético Hidalgo	30	5	4	21	29	74	−45	4	23	
15	Real San Cosme	30	6	3	21	35	85	−50	1	22	
16	Unión Acolman	30	2	1	27	26	149	−123	0	7	

Source: Tercera División

== Group 7 ==
Group with 16 teams from Greater Mexico City.

=== Teams ===
Location of teams in the 2012–13 3ra División Group 7 (Greater Mexico City)

Team	City	Home ground	Capacity	Affiliate	Official name
Atlético San Juan de Aragón	Papalotla, State of Mexico	Deportivo Municipal Papalotla	500	–	–
Buendía	Iztacalco, Mexico City	Magdalena Mixhuca Sports City	500	–	–
CEFOR Cuauhtémoc Blanco	Venustiano Carranza, Mexico City	Deportivo Plutarco Elías Calles	1,000	–	–
Frailes Homape	Xochimilco, Mexico City	San Isidro	1,000	–	–
Halcones del Valle del Mezquital	Gustavo A. Madero, Mexico City	Deportivo Los Galeana	2,000	–	–
Independiente Mexiquense	Nicolás Romero, State of Mexico	Progreso Industrial	1,500	–	–
Leones de Lomar	Xochimilco, Mexico City	San Isidro	1,200	–	–
Panteras de Lindavista	Gustavo A. Madero, Mexico City	Deportivo Plutarco Elías Calles	1,000	–	–
Plateros	Iztacalco, Mexico City	Jesús Martínez "Palillo"	6,000	–	–
Potros de Hierro	Huixquilucan de Degollado, State of Mexico	Universidad Anáhuac México Norte	300	Atlante	–
Proyecto Nuevo Chimalhuacán	Chimalhuacán, State of Mexico	Tepalcates	5,000	Nuevo Chimalhuacán	–
Reyes de Texcoco	Texcoco, State of Mexico	Municipal Claudio Suárez	4,000	–	–
San José del Arenal	Chalco, State of Mexico	Joaquín Iracheta	2,000	–	–
Sport Clinic Ciudad de México	Tlalpan, Mexico City	Centro Social y Deportivo Rosario Iglesias	1,000	–	–
Teca Huixquilucan	Texcoco de Mora, State of Mexico	Deportivo San Martín	1,000	–	–
Vikingos de Chalco	Chalco, State of Mexico	La Granja	1,500	–	–

=== League table ===
Pos	Team	Pld	W	D	L	GF	GA	GD	BP	Pts	Qualification or relegation
1	CEFOR Cuauhtémoc Blanco	30	23	4	3	96	20	+76	1	74	Promotion play-offs
2	Buendía	30	24	2	4	98	36	+62	0	74	Promotion play-offs
3	Proyecto Nuevo Chimalhuacán	30	22	4	4	83	36	+47	3	73	Promotion play-offs
4	Sport Clinic Ciudad de México	30	19	5	6	82	38	+44	3	65	Promotion play-offs
5	Potros de Hierro	30	15	6	9	57	40	+17	3	54	
6	Panteras de Lindavista	30	15	7	8	54	34	+20	1	53	
7	Independiente Mexiquense	30	16	4	10	52	43	+9	1	53	
8	San José del Arenal	30	13	7	10	58	50	+8	6	52	
9	Halcones del Valle del Mezquital	30	10	9	11	38	47	−9	6	45	
10	Atlético San Juan de Aragón	30	8	8	14	35	48	−13	6	38	
11	Frailes Homape	30	9	6	15	40	66	−26	5	38	
12	Reyes de Texcoco	30	10	4	16	38	51	−13	1	35	
13	Leones de Lomar	30	7	7	16	44	76	−32	4	32	
14	Teca Huixquilucan	30	3	4	23	26	110	−84	0	13	
15	Vikingos de Chalco	30	3	2	25	27	81	−54	0	11	
16	Plateros	30	2	3	25	20	72	−52	1	10	

Source: Tercera División

== Group 8 ==
Group with 17 teams from Guanajuato, Guerrero, Michoacán and Querétaro.

=== Teams ===
Location of teams in the 2012–13 3ra División Group 8 (Guanajuato and Querétaro)
Location of teams in the 2012–13 3ra División Group 8 (Guerrero)
Location of teams in the 2012–13 3ra División Group 8 (Michoacán)

Team	City	Home ground	Capacity	Affiliate	Official name
Atlético San Miguel	Acámbaro, Guanajuato	Fray Salvador Rangel	4,000	–	–
Cobras de Querétaro	Querétaro City, Querétaro	Unidad Deportiva La Cañada	3,000	–	–
Delfines de Abasolo	Abasolo, Guanajuato	Municipal de Abasolo	2,500	–	–
Deportivo Corregidora	Corregidora, Querétaro	Municipal de Querétaro	12,000	–	–
Felinos de Querétaro	Querétaro City, Querétaro	Unidad Deportiva La Cañada	3,000	–	Atlético Iztacalco
Gallos Blancos de Zihuatanejo	Zihuatanejo, Guerrero	Unidad Deportiva Municipal Zihuatanejo	2,000	Querétaro	–
Jaral del Progreso	Jaral del Progreso, Guanajuato	Unidad Deportiva Municipal	1,000	–	–
Limoneros de Apatzingán	Apatzingán, Michoacán	Unidad Deportiva Adolfo López Mateos	5,000	Monarcas Morelia	–
Lobos de Zihuatanejo	Zihuatanejo, Guerrero	Unidad Deportiva Municipal Zihuatanejo	2,000	–	–
Monarcas Morelia	Morelia, Michoacán	Morelos practice field Venustiano Carranza	1,000; 17,000	Monarcas Morelia	–
Monarcas Zacapu	Zacapu, Michoacán	Municipal de Zacapu	2,500	Monarcas Morelia	–
Originales Aguacateros	Uruapan, Michoacán	Unidad Deportiva Hermanos López Rayón	5,000	–	–
Querétaro	Querétaro, Querétaro	Unidad Deportiva La Cañada	3,000	Querétaro	–
Santa Rosa	Querétaro, Querétaro	Parque Bicentenario	1,000	–	–
Toros de Tequisquiapan	Tequisquiapan, Querétaro	Unidad Deportiva Emiliano Zapata	1,000	–	San Juan del Río
Tota Carbajal	León, Guanajuato	Club Cabezas Rojas	1,000	–	Cabezas Rojas
CDU Uruapan	Uruapan, Michoacán	Unidad Deportiva Hermanos López Rayón	5,000	–	Peces Blancos de Pátzcuaro

=== League table ===
Pos	Team	Pld	W	D	L	GF	GA	GD	BP	Pts	Qualification or relegation
1	Monarcas Morelia	32	29	1	2	144	13	+131	0	88	Promotion play-offs
2	Limoneros de Apatzingán	32	26	3	3	102	16	+86	2	83	Promotion play-offs
3	CDU Uruapan	32	20	7	5	81	30	+51	6	73	Promotion play-offs
4	Delfines de Abasolo	32	21	3	8	74	33	+41	1	67	Promotion play-offs
5	Gallos Blancos de Zihuatanejo	32	19	6	7	70	33	+37	4	67	Promotion play-offs
6	Originales Aguacateros	32	20	4	8	91	36	+55	2	66	
7	Tota Carbajal	32	19	6	7	75	43	+32	2	65	
8	Cobras de Querétaro	32	15	7	10	52	33	+19	3	55	
9	Monarcas Zacapu	32	14	6	12	58	43	+15	5	53	
10	Querétaro	32	8	8	16	37	53	−16	3	35	
11	Jaral del Progreso	32	9	5	18	52	69	−17	1	33	
12	Deportivo Corregidora	32	8	6	18	26	55	−29	1	31	
13	Atlético San Miguel	32	7	4	21	31	91	−60	2	27	
14	Felinos de Querétaro	32	5	5	22	30	102	−72	3	23	
15	Santa Rosa	32	6	1	25	19	94	−75	1	20	
16	Lobos de Zihuatanejo	32	4	3	25	26	139	−113	1	16	
17	Toros de Tequisquiapan	32	3	3	26	23	108	−85	2	14	

Source: Tercera División

== Group 9 ==
Group with 18 teams from Aguascalientes, Guanajuato, Jalisco, Michoacán, San Luis Potosí and Zacatecas.

=== Teams ===
Location of teams in the 2012–13 3ra División Group 9 (Guanajuato)
Location of teams in the 2012–13 3ra División Group 9 (Aguascalientes, San Luis Potosí and Zacatecas)
Location of teams in the 2012–13 3ra División Group 9 (Jalisco and Michoacán)

Team	City	Home ground	Capacity	Affiliate	Official name
Atlético ECCA	León, Guanajuato	Unidad Deportiva Enrique Fernández Martínez	1,500	–	–
Atlético Huejutla	Morelos, Zacatecas	Unidad Deportiva Minera Madero	1,000	–	–
Atlético San Francisco	San Francisco del Rincón, Guanajuato	Domingo Velázquez	3,500	–	–
Cabezas Rojas	León, Guanajuato	Club Cabezas Rojas	1,000	–	–
Celaya	Celaya, Guanajuato	Miguel Alemán Valdés	23,182	Celaya	–
Colegio Guanajuato	León, Guanajuato	Colegio Guanajuato	1,000	–	–
Deportivo El Milagro	Degollado, Jalisco	Municipal Degollado	2,000	–	–
Gallos Hidrocálidos	Cosío, Aguascalientes	Unidad Deportiva Cosío	1,000	–	–
Libertadores	Ciudad Manuel Doblado, Guanajuato	Municipal Manuel Doblado	1,000	–	–
Lobos de San Luis	San Luis Potosí City, San Luis Potosí	Unidad Deportiva Adolfo López Mateos	1,000	–	–
Mineros de Fresnillo	Fresnillo, Zacatecas	Minera Fresnillo	6,000	–	–
Necaxa	Aguascalientes City, Aguascalientes	Casa Club Necaxa	600	–	–
Real Leonés	León, Guanajuato	Club Empress	500	–	–
Real Zamora	Zamora, Michoacán	Unidad Deportiva El Chamizal	5,000	–	–
Reboceritos de La Piedad	La Piedad, Michoacán	Unidad Deportiva Lic. Humberto Romero	1,000	La Piedad	–
Tuzos UAZ	Zacatecas, Zacatecas	Universitario Unidad Deportiva Norte	5,000	Tuzos UAZ	–
Unión León	León, Guanajuato	Lalo Gutiérrez	1,000	–	–
F.C. Zacatecas	Jerez, Zacatecas	Ramón López Velarde	3,000	–	–

=== League table ===
Pos	Team	Pld	W	D	L	GF	GA	GD	BP	Pts	Qualification or relegation
1	Real Zamora	34	27	2	5	117	30	+87	1	84	Promotion play-offs
2	Celaya	34	22	9	3	94	26	+68	4	79	Promotion play-offs
3	Atlético ECCA	34	24	4	6	113	36	+77	2	78	Promotion play-offs
4	Atlético San Francisco	34	22	8	4	91	44	+47	4	78	Promotion play-offs
5	Colegio Guanajuato	34	22	7	5	86	33	+53	4	77	Promotion play-offs
6	Necaxa	34	18	7	9	86	46	+40	5	66	
7	Tuzos UAZ	34	18	5	11	79	46	+33	4	63	
8	Mineros de Fresnillo	34	19	4	11	70	51	+19	1	62	
9	F.C. Zacatecas	34	16	8	10	70	59	+11	3	59	
10	Reboceritos de La Piedad	34	15	4	15	74	63	+11	3	52	
11	Cabezas Rojas	34	12	8	14	52	62	−10	1	45	
12	Unión León	34	12	5	17	58	66	−8	2	43	
13	Lobos de San Luis	34	4	12	18	37	78	−41	6	30	
14	Real Leonés	34	8	3	23	34	85	−51	3	30	
15	Deportivo El Milagro	34	7	4	23	39	102	−63	3	28	
16	Libertadores	34	4	5	25	21	107	−86	0	17	
17	Atlético Huejutla	34	3	4	27	31	120	−89	2	15	
18	Gallos Hidrocálidos	34	2	3	29	28	126	−98	3	12	

Source: Tercera División

== Group 10 ==
Group with 17 teams from Colima and Jalisco.

=== Teams ===
Location of teams in the 2012–13 3ra División Group 10

Team	City	Home ground	Capacity	Affiliate	Official name
Alianza de Sayula	Sayula, Jalisco	Unidad Deportiva Gustavo Díaz Ordaz (Sayula)	2,000	–	–
Arandas	Arandas, Jalisco	Unidad Deportiva Gustavo Díaz Ordaz (Arandas)	1,500	–	–
Atlético Cocula	Tlaquepaque, Jalisco	Unidad Deportiva Revolución Mexicana	4,000	–	–
Atlético Tecomán	Tecomán, Colima	Víctor Eduardo Sevilla Torres	2,000	–	–
Atotonilco	Atotonilco El Alto, Jalisco	Unidad Deportiva Margarito Ramírez	1,500	–	–
Charales de Chapala	Chapala, Jalisco	Municipal Juan Rayo	1,000	–	–
Colegio Once México	Zapopan, Jalisco	Colegio Once México	3,000	Colegio Once México	–
Comala Pueblo Mágico	Comala, Colima	Colima	12,000	–	Mérida F.C.
Deportivo Acatic	Acatic, Jalisco	Unidad Deportiva Acatic	1,000	–	–
Escuela de Fútbol Chivas	Zapopan, Jalisco	Chivas San Rafael	500	Guadalajara	–
Nuevos Valores de Ocotlán	Ocotlán, Jalisco	Municipal Benito Juárez	1,500	Leones Negros UdeG	–
Oro	Zapopan, Jalisco	Campos Telmex	1,000	Oro	–
Tepatitlán	Tepatitlán, Jalisco	Gregorio "Tepa" Gómez	10,000	–	–
Valle del Grullo	Zapopan, Jalisco	Deportivo Diablos Tesistán	1,000	–	–
Vaqueros	Acatlán de Juárez, Jalisco	Juan Bigotón Jasso	1,500	–	–
Vaqueros Ixtlahuacán	Ixtlahuacán de los Membrillos, Jalisco	Santa Rosa	1,000	–	–
Volcanes de Colima	Colima City, Colima	Unidad Deportiva Morelos	2,000	–	–

=== League table ===
Pos	Team	Pld	W	D	L	GF	GA	GD	BP	Pts	Qualification or relegation
1	Tepatitlán	32	27	2	3	94	20	+74	2	85	Promotion play-offs
2	Vaqueros Ixtlahuacán	32	22	7	3	85	26	+59	4	77	Promotion play-offs
3	Escuela de Fútbol Chivas	32	17	9	6	64	32	+32	6	66	Reserve Teams play-offs
4	Vaqueros	32	20	4	8	89	47	+42	0	64	Promotion play-offs
5	Charales de Chapala	32	15	10	7	53	30	+23	7	62	Promotion play-offs
6	Atlético Tecomán	32	19	3	10	81	47	+34	1	61	Promotion play-offs
7	Atotonilco	32	14	11	7	58	33	+25	5	58	
8	Nuevos Valores de Ocotlán	32	16	5	11	80	40	+40	3	56	
9	Comala Pueblo Mágico	32	13	10	9	66	46	+20	4	53	
10	Alianza de Sayula	32	10	7	15	47	55	−8	4	41	
11	Deportivo Acatic	32	9	9	14	49	58	−9	4	40	
12	Colegio Once México	32	9	7	16	50	72	−22	5	39	
13	Atlético Cocula	32	10	6	16	37	51	−14	2	38	
14	Arandas	32	7	8	17	47	67	−20	2	31	
15	Valle del Grullo	32	5	7	20	35	72	−37	3	25	
16	Volcanes de Colima	32	2	4	26	14	140	−126	2	12	
17	Oro	32	1	3	28	28	141	−113	2	8	

Source: Tercera División

== Group 11 ==
Group with 18 teams from Jalisco, Michoacán and Nayarit.

=== Teams ===
Location of teams in the 2012–13 3ra División Group 11 (Jalisco, Michoacán and Nayarit)

Team	City	Home ground	Capacity	Affiliate	Official name
Atlas	Zapopan, Jalisco	CECAF	1,000	Atlas	–
Aves Blancas	Tepatitlán, Jalisco	Corredor Industrial	1,200	–	–
Cachorros Atotonilco	Zapopan, Jalisco	Club Deportivo La Primavera	3,000	Leones Negros UdeG	–
Cazcanes de Ameca	Ameca, Jalisco	Núcleo Deportivo y de Espectáculos Ameca	4,000	–	–
Cocula	Zapopan, Jalisco	Club Deportivo La Primavera	3,000	–	–
Deportivo Las Varas	Compostela, Nayarit	Campo La Alameda	500	–	–
Deportivo Los Altos	Yahualica, Jalisco	Las Ánimas	8,500	Deportivo Los Altos	–
Deportivo Nayarit	Tepic, Nayarit	Arena Cora	12,271	Coras	–
Deportivo Tomates	Tomatlán, Jalisco	Alejandro Ruelas Ibarra	1,000	–	–
Estudiantes Tecos	Zapopan, Jalisco	Tres de Marzo	18,779	Estudiantes Tecos	–
Guadalajara	Zapopan, Jalisco	Verde Valle	800	Guadalajara	–
Leones Negros UdeG Talpa	Talpa de Allende, Jalisco	Unidad Deportiva Halcón Peña	1,000	Leones Negros UdeG	–
Nacional	Guadalajara, Jalisco	Club Deportivo Occidente	1,000	–	–
Revolucionarios	Zapopan, Jalisco	Colegio Once México	3,000	–	–
Queseros de San José	San José de Gracia, Michoacán	Juanito Chávez	1,500	–	–
Sahuayo	Sahuayo, Michoacán	Unidad Deportiva Municipal	1,500	Sahuayo	–
Yurécuaro	Yurécuaro, Michoacán	Unidad Deportiva Centenario	1,000	–	–
Zapotlanejo	Zapotlanejo, Jalisco	Miguel Hidalgo	1,500	–	–

=== League table ===
Pos	Team	Pld	W	D	L	GF	GA	GD	BP	Pts	Qualification or relegation
1	Cazcanes de Ameca	34	21	8	5	74	34	+40	5	76	Promotion play-offs
2	Estudiantes Tecos	34	21	7	6	84	33	+51	3	73	Reserve Teams play-offs
3	Yurécuaro	34	20	9	5	95	38	+57	3	72	Promotion play-offs
4	Guadalajara	34	20	6	8	85	36	+49	2	68	Reserve Teams play-offs
5	Cachorros Atotonilco	34	18	7	9	64	34	+30	6	67	Promotion play-offs
6	Deportivo Las Varas	34	17	10	7	61	33	+28	5	66	Promotion play-offs
7	Deportivo Nayarit	34	19	7	8	79	38	+41	1	65	Promotion play-offs
8	Deportivo Los Altos	34	19	5	10	107	72	+35	3	65	
9	Aves Blancas	34	17	9	8	78	44	+34	5	65	
10	Atlas	34	16	6	12	60	44	+16	1	55	
11	Cocula	34	10	9	15	59	68	−9	8	47	
12	Revolucionarios	34	11	3	20	51	69	−18	2	38	
13	Sahuayo	34	10	5	19	52	66	−14	2	37	
14	Zapotlanejo	34	9	4	21	44	86	−42	3	34	
15	Deportivo Tomates	34	7	8	19	36	89	−53	3	32	
16	Leones Negros UdeG Talpa	34	5	5	24	26	77	−51	2	22	
17	Queseros de San José	34	5	3	26	34	118	−84	1	19	
18	Nacional	34	4	3	27	31	141	−110	2	17	

Source: Tercera División

== Group 12 ==
Group with 17 teams from Coahuila, Nuevo León, San Luis Potosí and Tamaulipas.

=== Teams ===
Location of teams in the 2012–13 3ra División Group 12 (Tamasopo, S.L.P., Tamaulipas and Veracruz)
Location of teams in the 2012–13 3ra División Group 12 (Coahuila, Matehuala, S.L.P and Nuevo León)

Team	City	Home ground	Capacity	Affiliate	Official name
Alianza Unetefan	Guadalupe, Nuevo León	Unidad Deportiva La Talaverna	5,000	–	–
Atlético Altamira	Altamira, Tamaulipas	Lázaro Cárdenas	2,500	–	–
Bravos de Nuevo Laredo	Nuevo Laredo, Tamaulipas	Unidad Deportiva Benito Juárez	5,000	Bravos de Nuevo Laredo	–
Canteranos Altamira	Altamira, Tamaulipas	Cancha 2 Club Altamira	500	Altamira	–
Correcaminos UAT	Ciudad Victoria, Tamaulipas	Universitario Eugenio Alvizo Porras	5,000	Correcaminos UAT	–
Coyotes de Saltillo	Saltillo, Coahuila	Olímpico Francisco I. Madero	7,000	–	–
Estudiantes Tecnológico de Nuevo Laredo	Nuevo Laredo, Tamaulipas	Olímpico del Tecnológico de Nuevo Laredo	1,200	–	–
Excélsior	General Escobedo, Nuevo León	Centro Deportivo Soriana	2,000	Excélsior	–
Ho Gar Matamoros	Matamoros, Tamaulipas	Pedro Salazar Maldonado	3,000	–	–
Jaguares de Nuevo León	San Nicolás de los Garza, Nuevo León	Unidad Deportiva Oriente	1,000	–	–
Monterrey	Monterrey, Nuevo León	El Cerrito	1,000	Monterrey	–
Orinegros de Ciudad Madero	Ciudad Madero, Tamaulipas	Olímpico del Tecnológico de Madero	7,000	–	–
Oxitipa Ciudad Valles	Ciudad Valles, San Luis Potosí	Unidad Deportiva de Veteranos	1,000	–	–
Panteras Negras GNL	Guadalupe, Nuevo León	Unidad Deportiva La Talaverna	5,000	–	–
Tigres SD	General Zuazua, Nuevo León	La Cueva de Zuazua	800	Tigres UANL	–
Troyanos UDEM	San Pedro Garza García, Nuevo León	Universidad de Monterrey	1,000	–	–
Tuneros de Matehuala	Matehuala, San Luis Potosí	Manuel Moreno Torres	2,000	–	–

=== League table ===
Pos	Team	Pld	W	D	L	GF	GA	GD	BP	Pts	Qualification or relegation
1	Orinegros de Ciudad Madero	32	25	6	1	73	20	+53	4	85	Promotion play-offs
2	Tigres SD	32	21	3	8	78	35	+43	2	68	Reserve Teams play-offs
3	Monterrey	32	20	6	6	97	39	+58	1	67	Reserve Teams play-offs
4	Correcaminos UAT	32	17	8	7	62	36	+26	7	66	Reserve Teams play-offs
5	Panteras Negras GNL	32	15	8	9	58	47	+11	3	56	Promotion play-offs
6	Ho Gar Matamoros	32	14	7	11	62	47	+15	3	52	Promotion play-offs
7	Troyanos UDEM	32	13	5	14	46	43	+3	5	49	Promotion play-offs
8	Canteranos Altamira	32	12	8	12	45	54	−9	3	47	
9	Bravos de Nuevo Laredo	32	12	5	15	62	75	−13	1	42	
10	Oxitipa Ciudad Valles	32	10	8	14	41	71	−30	4	42	
11	Coyotes de Saltillo	32	10	6	16	36	47	−11	3	39	
12	Jaguares de Nuevo León	32	9	8	15	47	65	−18	3	38	
13	Estudiantes Tecnológico de Nuevo Laredo	32	10	5	17	38	69	−31	3	38	
14	Excélsior	32	6	12	14	40	64	−24	6	36	
15	Tuneros de Matehuala	32	8	6	18	39	67	−28	4	34	
16	Atlético Altamira	32	8	6	18	48	60	−12	1	31	
17	Alianza Unetefan	32	8	1	23	36	69	−33	1	26	

Source: Tercera División

== Group 13 ==
Group with 11 teams from Baja California, Sinaloa and Sonora.

=== Teams ===
Location of teams in the 2012–13 3ra División Group 13

Team	City	Home ground	Capacity	Affiliate	Official name
Águilas UAS	Culiacán, Sinaloa	Universitario UAS	3,500	–	–
Deportivo Guamúchil	Guamúchil, Sinaloa	Coloso del Dique	5,000	Murciélagos	–
Deportivo La Cruz	La Cruz, Sinaloa	Juan Lauro Martínez Barreda	1,000	–	–
Diablos Azules de Guasave	Guasave, Sinaloa	Armando "Kory" Leyson	9,000	–	–
Dorados de Sinaloa	Culiacán, Sinaloa	Unidad Deportiva JAPAC	1,000	Dorados de Sinaloa	–
Guerreros Pericúes	Cabo San Lucas, Baja California Sur	Complejo Deportivo Don Koll	3,500	–	–
Héroes de Caborca	Caborca, Sonora	Fidencio Hernández	3,000	–	–
Indios Cucapá	San Luis Río Colorado, Sonora	México 70	2,000	–	–
Mazatlán	Mazatlán, Sinaloa	Unidad Deportiva SAHOP	1,000	–	–
Poblado Miguel Alemán	Miguel Alemán, Sonora	Alejandro López Caballero	4,000	–	–
Tijuana	Tecate, Baja California	Unidad Deportiva Eufracio Santana	1,000	Tijuana	–

=== League table ===
Pos	Team	Pld	W	D	L	GF	GA	GD	BP	Pts	Qualification or relegation
1	Poblado Miguel Alemán	20	18	1	1	84	32	+52	0	55	Promotion play-offs
2	Diablos Azules de Guasave	20	15	2	3	57	29	+28	1	48	Promotion play-offs
3	Águilas UAS	20	12	3	5	44	25	+19	1	40	Promotion play-offs
4	Mazatlán	20	10	2	8	38	40	−2	1	33	Promotion play-offs
5	Deportivo Guamúchil	20	9	2	9	37	43	−6	1	30	
6	Dorados de Sinaloa	20	6	5	9	39	30	+9	3	26	
7	Tijuana	20	7	4	9	32	37	−5	1	26	
8	Indios Cucapá	20	7	4	9	29	42	−13	1	26	
9	Guerreros Pericúes	20	3	7	10	29	46	−17	6	22	
10	Héroes de Caborca	20	4	0	16	23	48	−25	0	12	
11	Deportivo La Cruz	20	2	4	14	19	59	−40	1	11	

Source: Tercera División

== Group 14 ==
Group with 9 teams from Chihuahua, Coahuila, Durango and Sonora.

=== Teams ===
Location of teams in the 2012–13 3ra División Group 14

Team	City	Home ground	Capacity	Affiliate	Official name
Aztecas	Gómez Palacio	Unidad Deportiva Francisco Gómez Palacio	5,000	–	–
Chinarras de Aldama	Aldama, Chihuahua	Ciudad Deportiva Chihuahua	4,000	–	–
Cobras Fútbol Premier	Chihuahua City, Chihuahua	Ciudad Deportiva Chihuahua	4,000	–	–
Generales de Navojoa	Navojoa, Sonora	Olímpico de Navojoa	4,000	–	–
La Tribu de Ciudad Juárez	Ciudad Juárez, Chihuahua	20 de Noviembre	2,500	–	–
Real Magari	Ciudad Juárez, Chihuahua	20 de Noviembre	2,500	–	–
San Isidro Laguna	Torreón, Coahuila	San Isidro	3,000	–	–
Soles de Ciudad Juárez	Ciudad Juárez, Chihuahua	20 de Noviembre	2,500	–	–
Toros	Torreón, Coahuila	Unidad Deportiva Torreón	1,000	–	–

=== League table ===
Pos	Team	Pld	W	D	L	GF	GA	GD	BP	Pts	Qualification or relegation
1	La Tribu de Ciudad Juárez	16	9	5	2	27	11	+16	4	36	Promotion play-offs
2	Soles de Ciudad Juárez	16	9	5	2	34	27	+7	3	35	Promotion play-offs
3	San Isidro Laguna	16	9	4	3	33	16	+17	2	33	Promotion play-offs
4	Generales de Navojoa	16	6	6	4	29	24	+5	5	29	Promotion play-offs
5	Toros	16	7	3	6	28	24	+4	2	26	
6	Cobras Fútbol Premier	16	6	3	7	23	18	+5	0	21	
7	Chinarras de Aldama	16	5	5	6	23	28	−5	0	20	
8	Aztecas	16	2	2	12	18	42	−24	1	9	
9	Real Magari	16	1	3	12	15	40	−25	1	7	

Source: Tercera División

== Promotion play-offs ==
=== Round of 64 ===
Team 1	Agg.	Team 2	1st leg	2nd leg
Poblado Miguel Alemán	X–X	(dnq) Mazatlán	X–X	X–X
Panteras Negras GNL	(p.) 4–4 (8–7)	Ho Gar Matamoros	1–3	3–1
Tepatitlán	4–2	Deportivo Las Varas	1–2	3–0
Monarcas Morelia	4–5	Atlético San Francisco	2–2	2–3
Cazcanes de Ameca	1–1 (3–5) (p.)	Charales de Chapala	0–1	1–0
Real Zamora	X–X	(dnq) Delfines de Abasolo	X–X	X–X
Yurécuaro	1–0	Vaqueros	1–0	0–0
Limoneros de Apatzingán	2–0	Atlético ECCA	0–0	2–0
Soles de Ciudad Juárez (dnq)	X–X	San Isidro Laguna	X–X	X–X
Diablos Azules de Guasave	5–2	Águilas UAS	1–1	4–1
Celaya	4–1	CDU Uruapan	2–1	2–0
Colegio Guanajuato	7–0	Bravos de Nuevo Laredo	4–0	3–0
Orinegros de Ciudad Madero	3–0	Troyanos UDEM	0–0	3–0
La Tribu de Ciudad Juárez	4–0	Generales de Navojoa	3–0	1–0
Vaqueros Ixtlahuacán	4–3	Cachorros Atotonilco	1–1	3–2
Deportivo Nayarit	6–3	Atlético Tecomán	2–1	4–2
Zitácuaro	5–2	Guerreros de Yecapixtla	1–1	4–1
Buendía	(p.) 4–4 (4–3)	Zacatepec 1948	3–4	1–0
Potros UAEM	2–2 (0–2) (p.)	Lobos BUAP	1–0	1–2
Proyecto Nuevo Chimalhuacán	3–4	Ángeles de la Ciudad	0–1	3–3
Chetumal	2–2 (5–6) (p.)	Jaguares de la 48	2–1	0–1
Star Club	3–4	Sport Clinic Ciudad de México	2–4	1–0
Corsarios de Campeche	3–0	Inter Playa del Carmen	0–0	3–0
Ballenas Galeana Morelos	6–3	Alpha	2–1	4–2
Langostineros de Atoyac	2–4	Estudiantes de San Andrés	1–2	1–2
Tuzos Pachuca	5–3	Sporting Canamy	2–3	3–0
Tecamachalco Sur	3–5	Chilpancingo	1–2	2–3
Estudiantes de Atlacomulco	4–3	Marina	1–1	3–2
Tecamachalco	7–1	Santiago Tulantepec	3–0	4–1
Petroleros de Poza Rica	3–1	Cruz Azul Lagunas	0–0	3–1
CEFOR Cuauhtémoc Blanco	4–2	Coyotes Neza	2–2	2–0
Tejupilco	1–1 (3–4) (p.)	Gallos Blancos de Zihuatanejo	0–1	1–0

=== Round of 32 ===
Team 1	Agg.	Team 2	1st leg	2nd leg
Poblado Miguel Alemán	7–3	Panteras Negras GNL	2–3	4–1
Tepatitlán	3–4	Deportivo Nayarit	1–2	2–2
Orinegros de Ciudad Madero	1–1 (5–6) (p.)	Charales de Chapala	0–1	1–0
Vaqueros Ixtlahuacán	2–1	La Tribu de Ciudad Juárez	0–0	2–1
Limoneros de Apatzingán	5–1	San Isidro Laguna	1–0	4–1
Diablos Azules de Guasave	3–2	Colegio Guanajuato	2–2	1–0
Celaya	2–1	Atlético San Francisco	1–1	1–0
Real Zamora	4–2	Yurécuaro	3–1	1–1
Zitácuaro	4–1	Lobos BUAP	0–1	4–0
Buendía	2–4	Ángeles de la Ciudad	1–4	1–0
Corsarios de Campeche	3–2	Sport Clinic Ciudad de México	2–1	1–1
Ballenas Galeana Morelos	2–3	Petroleros de Poza Rica	1–3	1–0
Tuzos Pachuca	7–2	Estudiantes de San Andrés	0–1	7–1
Estudiantes de Atlacomulco	4–5	Chilpancingo	1–1	3–4
Tecamachalco	(p.) 3–3 (5–4)	Jaguares de la 48	0–2	3–1
CEFOR Cuauhtémoc Blanco	3–1	Gallos Blancos de Zihuatanejo	0–1	3–0

=== Final stage ===
Round of 16
1N	Poblado Miguel Alemán	3	4	7
8N	Deportivo Nayarit	5	1	6
2N	Limoneros de Apatzingán	0	2	2(3)
7N	Charales de Chapala (p.)	2	0	2(5)
4N	Vaqueros Ixtlahuacán (p.)	1	1	2 (10)
5N	Diablos Azules	1	1	2 (9)
3N	Real Zamora	0	0	0
6N	Celaya	0	1	1
1S	Zitácuaro	1	2	3
8S	Ángeles de la Ciudad	1	0	1
4S	CEFOR Cuauhtémoc Blanco	0	1	1
5S	Corsarios de Campeche	2	0	2
2S	Tecamachalco	2	2	4
7S	Petroleros de Poza Rica	3	0	3
3S	Tuzos Pachuca	1	1	2
6S	Chilpancingo	1	0	1

Quarter-finals
1N	Poblado Miguel Alemán	1	4	5
7N	Charales de Chapala	0	0	0
4N	Vaqueros Ixtlahuacán	1	1	2
6N	Celaya	3	1	4
1S	Zitácuaro (p.)	0	1	1 (6)
5S	Corsarios de Campeche	0	1	1 (5)
2S	Tecamachalco	2	0	2
3S	Tuzos Pachuca	1	0	1

Semi-finals
1N	Poblado Miguel Alemán	2	4	6
6N	Celaya	3	2	5
1S	Zitácuaro	0	1	1
2S	Tecamachalco	8	1	9

Final
1N	Poblado Miguel Alemán	2	3	5
2S	Tecamachalco	2	2	4

==== Round of 16 ====
Team 1	Agg.	Team 2	1st leg	2nd leg
Poblado Miguel Alemán	7–6	Deportivo Nayarit	3–5	4–1
Limoneros de Apatzingán	2–2 (3–5) (p.)	Charales de Chapala	0–2	2–0
Vaqueros Ixtlahuacán	(p.) 2–2 (10–9)	Diablos Azules de Guasave	1–1	1–1
Real Zamora	0–1	Celaya	0–0	0–1
Zitácuaro	3–1	Ángeles de la Ciudad	1–1	2–0
CEFOR Cuauhtémoc Blanco	1–2	Corsarios de Campeche	0–2	1–0
Tecamachalco	4–3	Petroleros de Poza Rica	2–3	2–0
Tuzos Pachuca	2–1	Chilpancingo	1–1	1–0

===== First leg =====
8 May 2013	Ángeles de la Ciudad	1–1	Zitácuaro	Mexico City
11:00	Sánchez 68'	Report	Castro 41'	Stadium: Estadio Jesús Martínez "Palillo"; Attendance: 200; Referee: Juan Ramírez Tostado

8 May 2013	Chilpancingo	1–1	Tuzos Pachuca	Chilpancingo
16:00	Domínguez 53'	Report	Becerril 47'	Stadium: Unidad Deportiva Vicente Guerrero; Attendance: 1,000; Referee: Luis Alberto Mattern García

8 May 2013	Petroleros de Poza Rica	3–2	Tecamachalco	Poza Rica
17:00	Vázquez 22' (own); Madrigal 44'; Pineda 49'	Report	Vázquez 65', 85'	Stadium: Estadio Heriberto Jara Corona; Attendance: 1,500; Referee: Arturo Isai González Montiel

8 May 2013	Deportivo Nayarit	5–3	Poblado Miguel Alemán	Tepic
19:00	Muñoz 8'; Ponce 27', 56'; Martín del Campo 39'; Aguirre 68'	Report	Martin del Campo 36' (own); Félix 74'; González 75'	Stadium: Estadio Nicolás Álvarez Ortega; Attendance: 200; Referee: Fernando Guillermo Sandoval Wong

8 May 2013	Celaya	0–0	Real Zamora	Celaya
20:00		Report		Stadium: Estadio Miguel Alemán Valdés; Attendance: 800; Referee: Iván Asael Martínez Gómez

8 May 2013	Corsarios de Campeche	2–0	CEFOR Cuauhtémoc Blanco	Campeche City
20:00	Que 48'; Álvarez 71'	Report		Stadium: Estadio Universitario de Campeche; Attendance: 300; Referee: Gilvero Alvarado Farjat

9 May 2013	Diablos Azules de Guasave	1–1	Vaqueros Ixtlahuacán	Guasave
16:00	Moreno 8'	Report	Ramos 37'	Stadium: Estadio Armando "Kory" Leyson; Attendance: 200; Referee: Francisco Eduardo Longorio López

9 May 2013	Charales de Chapala	2–0	Limoneros de Apatzingán	Chapala
18:00	Ibarra 23'; Ríos 32'	Report		Stadium: Estadio Municipal Juan Rayo; Attendance: 500; Referee: Ivan Camacho Silva

===== Second leg =====
11 May 2013	Tecamachalco	2–0 (4–3 agg.)	Petroleros de Poza Rica	Huixquilucan de Degollado
12:00	García 46'; Rivera 85'	Report		Stadium: Estadio Alberto Pérez Navarro; Attendance: 300; Referee: Saul Alfredo Silva Pineda

11 May 2013	Tuzos Pachuca	1–0 (2–1 agg.)	Chilpancingo	Pachuca
13:00	Ayala 59'	Report		Stadium: Estadio Hidalgo; Attendance: 200; Referee: Oldahir Sandoval Ortíz

11 May 2013	CEFOR Cuauhtémoc Blanco	1–0 (1–2 agg.)	Corsarios de Campeche	Mexico City
13:00	Garibay 60'	Report		Stadium: Deportivo Plutarco Elías Calles; Attendance: 200; Referee: Christopher Molina Díaz

11 May 2013	Zitácuaro	2–0 (3–1 agg.)	Ángeles de la Ciudad	Zitácuaro
15:30	Piña 21'; Gómez 49'	Report		Stadium: Estadio Ignacio López Rayón; Attendance: 300; Referee: Alejandro Agustín Martínez Macías

11 May 2013	Poblado Miguel Alemán	4–1 (7–6 agg.)	Deportivo Nayarit	Miguel Alemán
19:00	Villa 7', 66', 78'; Romero 84'	Report	Martín del Campo 52'	Stadium: Estadio Alejandro López Caballero; Attendance: 1,000; Referee: Omar Antonio Fernández Martínez

11 May 2013	Real Zamora	0–1 (0–1 agg.)	Celaya	Zamora
20:00		Report	Almaguer 76'	Stadium: Unidad Deportiva El Chamizal; Attendance: 1,500; Referee: Juan Andrés Esquivel González

12 May 2013	Limoneros de Apatzingán	2–0 (2–2 agg.) (3–5 p)	Charales de Chapala	Apatzingán
15:30	Ríos 2', 74'	Report		Stadium: Unidad Deportiva Adolfo López Mateos; Attendance: 1,000; Referee: José Juan Contreras García

12 May 2013	Vaqueros Ixtlahuacán	1–1 (2–2 agg.) (10–9 p)	Diablos Azules de Guasave	Ixtlahuacán de los Membrillos
17:00	Carrillo 42'	Report	Moreno 11'	Stadium: Campo Santa Rosa; Attendance: 200; Referee: Jonatan Mercado Figueroa

==== Quarter-finals ====
Team 1	Agg.	Team 2	1st leg	2nd leg
Poblado Miguel Alemán	5–0	Charales de Chapala	1–0	4–0
Vaqueros Ixtlahuacán	2–4	Celaya	1–3	1–1
Zitácuaro	(p.) 1–1 (6–5)	Corsarios de Campeche	0–0	1–1
Tecamachalco	2–1	Tuzos Pachuca	2–1	0–0

===== First leg =====
15 May 2013	Tuzos Pachuca	1–2	Tecamachalco	Pachuca
12:00	Carmona 31'	Report	Lara 17', 62'	Stadium: Estadio Hidalgo; Attendance: 200; Referee: José Arturo Maldonado Ramírez

15 May 2013	Charales de Chapala	0–1	Poblado Miguel Alemán	Chapala
18:00		Report	Melendez 7'	Stadium: Estadio Municipal Juan Rayo; Attendance: 1,000; Referee: Antonio de Jesús Olalde Vázquez

15 May 2013	Corsarios de Campeche	0–0	Zitácuaro	Campeche City
20:00		Report		Stadium: Estadio Universitario de Campeche; Attendance: 800; Referee: Luis Alberto Mattern García

16 May 2013	Celaya	3–1	Vaqueros Ixtlahuacán	Celaya
19:30	Almaguer 27'; Chaurand 51'; Valenzuela 82'	Report	Álvarez 1'	Stadium: Estadio Miguel Alemán Valdés; Attendance: 1,000; Referee: Oldahir Sandoval Ortiz

===== Second leg =====
18 May 2013	Tecamachalco	0–0 (1–2 agg.)	Tuzos Pachuca	Huixquilucan de Degollado
12:00		Report		Stadium: Estadio Alberto Pérez Navarro; Attendance: 600; Referee: Aldo Cano Martínez

18 May 2013	Zitácuaro	1–1 (1–1 agg.) (6–5 p)	Corsarios de Campeche	Zitácuaro
15:30	Villalvazo 76'	Report	Delgadillo 81'	Stadium: Estadio Ignacio López Rayón; Attendance: 2,000; Referee: Juan Andrés Esquivel González

18 May 2013	Poblado Miguel Alemán	4–0 (5–0 agg.)	Charales de Chapala	Miguel Alemán
19:00	Rivera 26'; Guerra 37'; Villa 42', 52'	Report		Stadium: Estadio Alejandro López Caballero; Attendance: 1,000; Referee: Francisco Raúl Medina Parra

19 May 2013	Vaqueros Ixtlahuacán	1–1 (2–4 agg.)	Celaya	Ixtlahuacán de los Membrillos
17:00	Segura 51' (own)	Report	Zavala 34'	Stadium: Campo Santa Rosa; Attendance: 800; Referee: Jesús Roberto Ruiz González

==== Semi-finals ====
Team 1	Agg.	Team 2	1st leg	2nd leg
Poblado Miguel Alemán	6–5	Celaya	2–3	4–2
Zitácuaro	1–9	Tecamachalco	0–8	1–1

===== First leg =====
22 May 2013	Tecamachalco	8–0	Zitácuaro	Huixquilucan de Degollado
12:00	Lara 13', 25'; Jaramillo 22'; Cristopher García 28'; Lara 32'; Carlos García 43', 82'; Avendaño 68' (own)	Report		Stadium: Estadio Alberto Pérez Navarro; Attendance: 300; Referee: Antonio de Jesús Olalde Vázquez

22 May 2013	Celaya	3–2	Poblado Miguel Alemán	Celaya
20:15	Almaguer 46'; Valenzuela 87'; Chaurand 88'	Report	Villa 6', 42'	Stadium: Estadio Miguel Alemán Valdés; Attendance: 1,500; Referee: Juan Andrés Esquivel González

===== Second leg =====
25 May 2013	Zitácuaro	1–1 (1–9 agg.)	Tecamachalco	Zitácuaro
15:30	Piña 83'	Report	Olmos 24'	Stadium: Estadio Ignacio López Rayón; Attendance: 800; Referee: Christian Adrián Ramírez Tejeda

25 May 2013	Poblado Miguel Alemán	4–2 (6–5 agg.)	Celaya	Miguel Alemán
19:00	González 10', 43'; Villa 17'; Guerra 32'	Report	Chaurand 12'; Moreno 26'	Stadium: Estadio Alejandro López Caballero; Attendance: 1,500; Referee: Francisco Raúl Medina Parra

==== Final ====
Team 1	Agg.	Team 2	1st leg	2nd leg
Poblado Miguel Alemán	5–4	Tecamachalco	2–2	3–2

===== First leg =====
30 May 2013	Tecamachalco	2–2	Poblado Miguel Alemán	Huixquilucan de Degollado
12:00		Report		Stadium: Estadio Alberto Pérez Navarro; Attendance: 600

===== Second leg =====
1 June 2013	Poblado Miguel Alemán	3–2 (5–4 agg.)	Tecamachalco	Miguel Alemán
19:00		Report		Stadium: Estadio Alejandro López Caballero; Attendance: 3,000

2012–13 winners

1st title

== Reserve teams play–offs ==
Quarter-finals
1	Cruz Azul Dublán	2	0	2
8	Guadalajara	0	1	1
2	TR Boca del Río	0	2	2 (4)
7	Correcaminos UAT (p.)	0	2	2 (5)
3	Estudiantes Tecos	1	1	2
6	Escuela de Fútbol Chivas	0	1	1
4	Tigres SD (p.)	1	3	4 (3)
5	Monterrey	4	0	4 (1)

Semi-finals
1	Cruz Azul Dublán	1	4	5
7	Correcaminos UAT	0	0	0
3	Estudiantes Tecos	3	0	3
4	Tigres SD	1	1	2

Final
1	Cruz Azul Dublán	0	1	1
3	Estudiantes Tecos	0	2	2

== See also ==
- Tercera División de México
