= 2011–12 Mexican Primera División season =

65th professional season of the top-flight football league in Mexico

Primera División de México
- Season: 2011–12
- Champions: Apertura: Tigres (3rd title); Clausura: Santos Laguna (4th title)
- Relegated: Tecos
- Champions League: Tigres; Santos Laguna; Guadalajara; Monterrey
- Copa Libertadores: Guadalajara; Cruz Azul; UANL
- Matches: 306
- Goals: 805 (2.63 per match)
- Top goalscorer: Apertura: Iván Alonso (11 goals); Clausura: Iván Alonso; Christian Benítez (14 goals)
- Biggest home win: Apertura: Tigres 5–0 Pachuca (September 10, 2011); Clausura: Monterrey 4-0 Tecos (March 24, 2012)
- Biggest away win: Apertura: Pachuca 1–4 Santos Laguna (July 23, 2011); Chiapas 1–4 Monterrey (July 24, 2011); Guadalajara 1-4 Puebla (September 17, 2011); Monterrey 0-3 América (October 15, 2011); UNAM 1-4 Atlas (October 16, 2011); Clausura: Atlante 0-4 América (February 25, 2012)
- Highest scoring: Apertura: Chiapas 5-3 América (September 17, 2011); Atlante 4-4 Morelia (October 29, 2011); Clausura: Toluca 3-4 Pachuca (February 5, 2012); Cruz Azul 4-3 Monterrey (March 3, 2012); Santos Laguna 5-2 San Luis (March 3, 2012); Cruz Azul 5-2 Tecos (April 21, 2012)

The 2011–12 Primera División Profesional was the 65th professional top-flight football league season in Mexico. The season was split into two tournaments: the Torneo Apertura and the Torneo Clausura; each of identical format and contested by the same eighteen teams.

== Moves ==
On May 16, 2011, the General Assembly of the Primera División announced a format change to begin with the 2011 Apertura. The first change was the elimination of groups in the First Stage. The top eight teams at the end of the First Stage would advance to the next round. The other change would affect the playoffs. Instead of a two-legged, single elimination tournament culminating in the finals, the eight teams in the next round would be placed into two groups of four. The four teams in each group will play against other in a double round-robin format. The top team in each group will advance to the Finals. However, on June 6, 2011, the Primera División Profesional's Operations Committee announced that the format change would only affect the elimination of groups in the First Stage, and that the playoffs would remain as they were. Therefore, the top eight teams at the end of the First Stage would advance to a two-legged elimination bracket.

== Clubs ==
Locations of the 2011–12 Primera División teams

The following eighteen teams participated in the season. Necaxa was relegated to the Liga de Ascenso after accumulating the lowest coefficient during the immediate past three seasons, ending its one-year stay in the league. Tijuana was promoted, the winner of the 2010–11 Liga de Ascenso season. This is Tijuana's inaugural season in the Primera División.

Club	Home City	Stadium	Capacity
América	Mexico City	Azteca	105,000
Atlante	Cancún	Andrés Quintana Roo	20,000
Atlas	Guadalajara	Jalisco	56,700
Chiapas	Tuxtla Gutiérrez	Víctor Manuel Reyna	31,500
Cruz Azul	Mexico City	Estadio Azul	35,000
Estudiantes Tecos	Zapopan	3 de Marzo	30,000
Guadalajara	Guadalajara	Omnilife	49,850
Monterrey	Monterrey	Tecnológico	38,000
Morelia	Morelia	Morelos	41,500
Pachuca	Pachuca, Hidalgo	Hidalgo	30,000
Puebla	Puebla	Cuauhtémoc	48,650
Querétaro	Querétaro	La Corregidora	40,785
San Luis	San Luis Potosí	Alfonso Lastras Ramírez	24,000
Santos Laguna	Torreón	Corona	30,000
Tijuana	Tijuana	Caliente	33,333
Toluca	Toluca	Nemesio Díez	27,000
UANL	San Nicolás	Universitario	45,000
UNAM	Mexico City	Olímpico Universitario	63,000

=== Personnel and kits ===
Team	Manager	Kit manufacturer	Shirt sponsor
América	(Mexico) Miguel Herrera	Nike	Bimbo, Coca-Cola
Atlante	(Mexico) José Luis González China	Garcis	Cancún, Riviera Maya, ADO, OfficeMax, Grupo Pegaso
Atlas	(Mexico) Juan Carlos Chávez	Atletica	Lubricantes Akron, Coca-Cola, Guadalajara 2011
Chiapas	(Mexico) José Guadalupe Cruz	Atletica	Banco Azteca, Seguro Popular
Cruz Azul	(Mexico) Enrique Meza	Umbro	Cemento Cruz Azul, Coca-Cola
Estudiantes Tecos	(Uruguay) Héctor Hugo Eugui	Under Armour	Grand Isla Navidad Resort
Guadalajara	(Mexico) Alberto Coyote	Adidas	Bimbo
Monterrey	(Mexico) Víctor Manuel Vucetich	Nike	Bimbo, BBVA Bancomer
Morelia	(Mexico) Tomás Boy	Atletica	Roshfrans, Cinépolis, Coca-Cola, Banco Azteca
Pachuca	(Mexico) Efraín Flores	Nike	Gamesa, Mobil Super, DHL, ADO
Puebla	(Uruguay) Daniel Bartolotta	Kappa	Volkswagen, Banco Azteca
Querétaro	(Argentina) Ángel Comizzo	Marval	Libertad Servicios Financieros, Powerade
San Luis	(Mexico) Sergio Bueno	Atletica	Caja Popular Mexicana, Coca-Cola
Santos Laguna	(Mexico) Benjamín Galindo	Puma	Soriana, Peñoles, Pepsi, Lala
Tijuana	(Argentina) Antonio Mohamed	Nike	Caliente, Volaris
Toluca	(Uruguay) Wilson Graniolatti	Under Armour	Banamex
UANL	(Brazil) Ricardo Ferretti	Adidas	Cemex, Cemento Monterrey
UNAM	(Mexico) Guillermo Vázquez	Puma	Banamex

=== Managerial changes ===
Team	Outgoing manager	Manner of departure	Date of vacancy	Replaced by	Date of appointment	Position in table
Pre-Apertura changes
Puebla	(Uruguay) Héctor Hugo Eugui	Resigned	May 6, 2011	(Mexico) Sergio Bueno	May 13, 2011	14th
Toluca	(Mexico) Sergio Lugo	Sacked	May 12, 2011	(Uruguay) Héctor Hugo Eugui	May 17, 2011	12th
Atlas	(Mexico) Benjamín Galindo	End of contract	May 23, 2011	(Argentina) Ruben Omar Romano	June 2, 2011	10th
Apertura changes
Estudiantes Tecos	(Mexico) José Luis Sánchez Solá	Sacked	August 8, 2011	(Mexico) José Luis Salgado	August 8, 2011	16th
Estudiantes Tecos	(Mexico) José Luis Salgado	End of tenure as caretaker	August 14, 2011	(Mexico) Raul Arias	August 15, 2011	9th
Querétaro	(Uruguay) Gustavo Matosas	Sacked	August 16, 2011	(Paraguay) José Saturnino Cardozo	August 16, 2011	8th
Santos Laguna	(Argentina) Diego Cocca	Sacked	September 4, 2011	(Mexico) Eduardo Rergis	September 4, 2011	14th
Santos Laguna	(Mexico) Eduardo Rergis	End of tenure as caretaker	September 14, 2011	(Mexico) Benjamín Galindo	September 14, 2011	15th
Atlas	(Argentina) Ruben Omar Romano	Resigned	September 17, 2011	(Mexico) Juan Carlos Chávez	September 18, 2011	18th
América	(Chile) Carlos Reinoso	Resigned	September 18, 2011	(Mexico) Alfredo Tena	September 19, 2011	16th
Tijuana	(Mexico) Joaquin del Olmo	Sacked	September 19, 2011	(Argentina) Antonio Mohamed	September 19, 2011	17th
Guadalajara	(Mexico) Jose Luis Real	Sacked	October 3, 2011	(Mexico) Fernando Quirarte	October 3, 2011	5th
Estudiantes Tecos	(Mexico) Raul Arias	Sacked	November 2, 2011	(Mexico) José Luis Salgado	November 2, 2011	13th
Pre-Clausura changes
Puebla	(Mexico) Sergio Bueno	Sacked	November 7, 2011	(Colombia) Juan Carlos Osorio	November 14, 2011	12th
América	(Mexico) Alfredo Tena	Sacked	November 10, 2011	(Mexico) Miguel Herrera	November 15, 2011	17th
San Luis	(Mexico) Ignacio Ambríz	Sacked	November 10, 2011	(Mexico) René Isidoro García	November 10, 2011	10th
Toluca	(Uruguay) Héctor Hugo Eugui	Sacked	November 10, 2011	(Uruguay) Wilson Graniolatti	November 14, 2011	13th
Atlante	(Mexico) Miguel Herrera	Contract Termination	November 15, 2011	(Mexico) Mario García	November 29, 2011	15th
Clausura changes
Estudiantes Tecos	(Mexico) José Luis Salgado	Resigned	January 14, 2012	(Mexico) Gilberto Adame	January 14, 2012	18th
Guadalajara	(Mexico) Fernando Quirarte	Resigned	January 21, 2012	(Mexico) Ignacio Ambríz	January 26, 2012	18th
Estudiantes Tecos	(Mexico) Gilberto Adame	End of tenure as caretaker	January 30, 2012	(Uruguay) Héctor Hugo Eugui	January 30, 2012	17th
San Luis	(Mexico) René Isidoro García	Resigned	February 25, 2012	(Mexico) Sergio Bueno	February 28, 2012	15th
Querétaro	(Paraguay) José Saturnino Cardozo	Resigned	March 3, 2012	(Argentina) Ángel Comizzo	March 5, 2012	18th
Puebla	(Colombia) Juan Carlos Osorio	Resigned	March 21, 2012	(Uruguay) Daniel Bartolotta	March 21, 2012	16th
Atlante	(Mexico) Mario García	Sacked	April 15, 2012	(Mexico) José Luis González China	April 15, 2012	15th
Guadalajara	(Mexico) Ignacio Ambriz	Resigned	April 18, 2012	(Mexico) Alberto Coyote	April 18, 2012	14th

== Torneo Apertura ==
The 2011 Apertura was the first competition of the season. The Regular Season began on July 22, 2011 and ended on November 6, 2011. The playoffs began on November 19, 2011 and ended on December 11, 2011. The team known as Pumas UNAM were the defending champion.

=== Regular phase ===
==== League table ====
Pos	Team	Pld	W	D	L	GF	GA	GD	Pts	Qualification
1	Guadalajara	17	8	6	3	24	18	+6	30 (Note: The top 8 score results qualify for the Playoffs.)	2012 Copa Libertadores Second Stage (Note: All 3 teams who qualify for Copa Libertadores will also participate in the Playoffs of this competition.)
2	Cruz Azul	17	8	5	4	21	14	+7	29	2012 Copa Libertadores Second Stage
3	UANL	17	7	7	3	22	13	+9	28	2012 Copa Libertadores First Stage
4	Santos Laguna	17	8	3	6	29	25	+4	27	Cannot qualify for South American competitions (Note: Monterrey, Morelia, Santos Laguna and UNAM cannot qualify for the 2012 Copa Libertadores because they are participating in the 2011-12 CONCACAF Champions League competition.)
5	Chiapas	17	7	5	5	28	23	+5	26	Advance to the Final Phase
6	Pachuca	17	7	5	5	28	25	+3	26	Advance to the Final Phase
7	Morelia	17	7	5	5	25	22	+3	26	Cannot qualify for South American competitions
8	Querétaro	17	8	2	7	24	21	+3	26	Advance to the Final Phase
9	UNAM	17	7	4	6	19	25	−6	25	Cannot qualify for South American competitions
10	San Luis	17	6	6	5	23	20	+3	24	
11	Monterrey	17	7	3	7	27	26	+1	24	Cannot qualify for South American competitions
12	Puebla	17	6	4	7	26	29	−3	22	
13	Toluca	17	4	8	5	19	27	−8	20	
14	Atlante	17	5	4	8	24	28	−4	19	
15	Tijuana	17	3	9	5	21	23	−2	18	
16	Estudiantes Tecos	17	6	0	11	24	30	−6	18	
17	América	17	3	6	8	26	31	−5	15	
18	Atlas	17	2	6	9	20	30	−10	12	

Source: FeMexFut
Rules for classification: 1) points; 2) goal difference; 3) number of goals scored.

=== Results ===
Home \ Away	AMÉ	ATE	ATL	CRU	EST	GUA	CHI	MON	MOR	PAC	PUE	QUE	SLU	SLA	TIJ	TOL	UNL	UNM
América		0–1	5–2		1–2	1–3			1–1		2–3	2–1	2–2		1–1			
Atlante					2–1	0–2			4–4	0–1	5–1	1–3	1–1		1–1		1–0	
Atlas		2–3			0–2	1–1			1–1		0–1	3–0	1–1		2–2		0–1	
Cruz Azul	3–1	2–1	2–1			1–1			0–1		2–0				2–1	0–0		
Estudiantes Tecos				0–2			0–2	2–3		2–1				5–2		1–2	0–1	1–2
Guadalajara					5–2		2–1	2–1		2–2	1–4	0–1					1–0	0–0
Chiapas	5–3	1–1	1–1	1–1				1–4					3–1	3–2		1–1		4–0
Monterrey	0–3	3–2	2–0	1–2					2–0					2–0	4–2	0–0		
Morelia					0–2	1–2	1–0			2–2	0–0	4–2					2–0	0–1
Pachuca	2–0		4–2	1–0			1–0	4–0					1–1	1–4		3–0		0–0
Puebla					2–1		1–2	3–3		2–2		1–0		1–2			0–1	2–1
Querétaro				1–0	3–0		1–2	2–1		2–1				1–3			0–0	4–0
San Luis				1–1	2–1	2–0		1–0	2–3		2–1	2–1		0–1		5–1		
Santos Laguna	1–1	3–0	3–0	1–0		1–1			0–2						1–3	3–2		
Tijuana					0–2	0–1	2–0		1–2	3–2	1–1	1–1	0–0				1–1	
Toluca	1–1	2–1	0–0			0–0			2–1		4–3	0–1			1–1			
UANL	2–2			1–1			1–1	0–0		5–0			1–0	2–1		2–2		4–1
UNAM	1–0	1–0	1–4	1–2				2–1					2–0	1–1	1–1	4–1		

Source: FeMexFut (in Spanish)
Legend: Blue = home team win; Yellow = draw; Red = away team win.

=== Final phase (Liguilla) ===
Quarterfinals
1	Guadalajara	1	0	1
8	Querétaro	2	0	2
3	UANL	1	3	4
6	Pachuca	0	0	0
2	Cruz Azul	1	1	2
7	Morelia	2	2	4
4	Santos	2	2	4
5	Chiapas	2	1	3

Semifinals
8	Querétaro	0	0	0
3	UANL	0	1	1
7	Morelia	2	2	4
4	Santos	1	3	4

Finals
3	UANL	1	3	4
4	Santos	0	1	1

Champions

3rd title

Notes

- If the two teams are tied after both legs, the higher seeded team advances.
- Both finalists qualify to the 2012–13 CONCACAF Champions League Group Stage.

=== Top goalscorers ===
Players ranked by goals scored, then alphabetically by last name.

Rank	Player	Club	Goals
1	(Uruguay) Iván Alonso	Toluca	11
2	(Uruguay) Carlos Bueno	Querétaro	10
2	(Mexico) Oribe Peralta	Santos Laguna	10
4	(Ecuador) Christian Benítez	América	8
4	(Mexico) Enrique Esqueda	Pachuca	8
4	(Mexico) Marco Fabián	Guadalajara	8
4	(Colombia) Jackson Martínez	Chiapas	8
8	(Spain) Luis García	Puebla	7
8	(United States) Herculez Gomez	Estudiantes Tecos	7
8	(Chile) Héctor Mancilla	Tigres	7
8	(Argentina) Alfredo Moreno	San Luis	7
8	(Colombia) Luis Gabriel Rey	Chiapas	7
8	(Mexico) Miguel Sabah	Morelia	7

=== Hat-tricks ===
Player	For	Against	Result	Date
(Mexico) Oribe Peralta	Santos Laguna	Pachuca	4–1	July 23, 2011
(Ecuador) Christian Benítez	América	Atlas	5–2	August 21, 2011
(Uruguay) Carlos Bueno	Querétaro	UNAM	4–0	September 10, 2011
(Chile) Héctor Mancilla	Tigres	Pachuca	5–0	September 10, 2011
(Mexico) Miguel Sabah	Morelia	Querétaro	4–2	September 18, 2011
(Mexico) Marco Fabián	Guadalajara	Estudiantes Tecos	5–2	October 15, 2011
(Uruguay) Iván Alonso	Toluca	Puebla	4–3	October 23, 2011

== Torneo Clausura ==
The 2012 Clausura is the second and final competition of the season. The regular season began on January 6, 2012 and ended on April 29, 2012. Tigres UANL was the defending champion.

=== Regular phase ===
==== League table ====
Pos	Team	Pld	W	D	L	GF	GA	GD	Pts	Qualification
1	Santos Laguna	17	11	3	3	33	18	+15	36	Advances to the Playoffs
2	Monterrey	17	9	5	3	32	15	+17	32	Advances to the Playoffs
3	América	17	9	5	3	30	18	+12	32	Advances to the Playoffs
4	Morelia	17	9	4	4	25	18	+7	31	Advances to the Playoffs
5	UANL	17	9	4	4	22	16	+6	31	Advances to the Playoffs
6	Pachuca	17	7	7	3	24	17	+7	28	Advances to the Playoffs
7	Tijuana	17	7	7	3	18	11	+7	28	Advances to the Playoffs
8	Chiapas	17	8	3	6	26	20	+6	27	Advances to the Playoffs
9	Cruz Azul	17	6	7	4	29	21	+8	25	
10	Toluca	17	6	4	7	24	27	−3	22	
11	Atlas	17	4	8	5	7	13	−6	20	
12	Puebla	17	5	4	8	19	23	−4	19	
13	Atlante	17	4	4	9	20	31	−11	16	
14	UNAM	17	3	7	7	13	18	−5	16	
15	Guadalajara	17	4	3	10	12	21	−9	15	
16	San Luis	17	3	3	11	15	30	−15	12	
17	Querétaro	17	2	6	9	14	30	−16	12	
18	Estudiantes Tecos	17	2	6	9	12	28	−16	12	

Updated to match(es) played on April 29, 2012. Source: MedioTiempo.com
Rules for classification: 1) points; 2) goal difference; 3) number of goals scored.

=== Results ===
Home \ Away	AMÉ	ATE	ATL	CRU	EST	GUA	CHI	MON	MOR	PAC	PUE	QUE	SLU	SLA	TIJ	TOL	UNL	UNM
América				2–2			2–0	2–3		1–0				3–1		1–1	0–1	2–1
Atlante	0–4		0–0	2–2			2–2	0–3						1–2		0–2		1–2
Atlas	1–1			0–2			0–3	1–0		0–0				1–3		1–0		0–0
Cruz Azul					5–2		2–0	4–3		1–1		1–2	3–1	0–1			1–1	1–1
Estudiantes Tecos	1–1	2–1	0–0			1–0			1–2		1–1	1–1	0–2		0–2			
Guadalajara	0–1	0–1	0–1	2–1					1–2				0–0	2–1	0–2	2–0		
Chiapas					1–0	3–1			1–0	3–2	0–1	3–0			0–0		2–2	
Monterrey					4–0	2–0	2–1			1–1	2–1	4–1	3–0				2–0	1–1
Morelia	3–1	1–1	0–0	2–0				0–0					2–0	3–1	1–1	1–2		
Pachuca		3–2			2–0	3–1			1–2		3–1	1–1			1–0		1–1	
Puebla	2–3	1–2	0–0	1–1		1–2			1–2				0–1		1–1	2–1		
Querétaro	0–2	2–3	2–1			0–0			0–3		0–1		2–2		0–2	2–2		
San Luis	1–3	2–3	0–1				2–3			0–0					0–1		0–2	1–0
Santos Laguna					1–1		1–0	1–1		0–0	3–1	2–0	5–2				3–0	2–1
Tijuana	1–1	2–1	2–0	0–0				1–0						1–3		1–1		1–1
Toluca				0–3	3–1		3–1	1–1		3–4			2–1	1–3			2–1	0–2
UANL		1–0	0–0		2–1	2–1			4–1		1–2	1–0			1–0			
UNAM					0–0	0–0	0–3		3–0	0–1	0–2	1–1					0–2	

Updated to match(es) played on April 29, 2012. Source: FeMexFut (in Spanish)
Legend: Blue = home team win; Yellow = draw; Red = away team win.

=== Final phase (Liguilla) ===
Quarterfinals
1	Santos	4	2	6
8	Chiapas	3	1	4
4	Morelia	0	1	1
5	Tigres	1	4	5
2	Monterrey	2	2	4
7	Tijuana	1	2	3
3	América	3	0	3
6	Pachuca	1	1	2

Semifinals
1	Santos	1	2	3
5	Tigres	1	2	3
2	Monterrey	0	2	2
3	América	0	0	0

Finals
1	Santos	1	2	3
2	Monterrey	1	1	2

Champions

4th title

Notes

- If the two teams are tied after both legs, the higher seeded team advances.
- Both finalists qualify to the 2012–13 CONCACAF Champions League Group Stage. Note: Santos were already qualified to 2012-13 Champions competition as the runners-up of the Apertura, and as they are Clausura Champions, their spot was relinquished as Apertura Runner-up to Guadalajara, the best record of the 2011 Apertura not already qualified.

=== Top goalscorers ===
Players ranked by goals scored, then alphabetically by last name.

Pos	Player	Club	Goals
1	(Uruguay) Iván Alonso	Toluca	14
1	(Ecuador) Christian Benítez	América	14
3	(Mexico) Aldo de Nigris	Monterrey	9
3	(Mexico) Oribe Peralta	Santos Laguna	9
3	(Mexico) Miguel Sabah	Morelia	9
6	(Argentina) Lucas Lobos	UANL	8
6	(Colombia) Luis Gabriel Rey	Chiapas	8
6	(Colombia) Jackson Martínez	Chiapas	8
6	(Argentina) Emanuel Villa	Cruz Azul	8
10	(Argentina) José Sand	Tijuana	7
10	(Chile) Humberto Suazo	Monterrey	7

=== Hat-tricks ===
Player	For	Against	Result	Date
(Mexico) Oribe Peralta ^{4}	Santos Laguna	San Luis	5–2	March 3, 2012
(Argentina) Mauro Cejas	Pachuca	Atlante	3–2	March 17, 2012

- ^{4} Player scored 4 goals

== Relegation ==
Pos	Team	'09 A Pts	'10 C Pts	'10 A Pts	'11 C Pts	'11 A Pts	'12 C Pts	Total Pts	Total Pld	Avg	Relegation
1	Monterrey	30	36	32	26	24	32	180	192	1.7647	
2	Cruz Azul	33	25	39	26	28	25	177	102	1.7353	
3	Santos Laguna	27	28	30	23	27	36	171	102	1.6765	
4	Morelia	33	25	21	31	26	31	167	102	1.6373	
5	UANL Tigres	22	19	24	35	28	31	159	102	1.5588	
6	América	30	25	27	26	15	32	155	102	1.5196	
7	Toluca	35	30	22	21	20	22	150	102	1.4706	
8	Pachuca	24	25	25	18	26	28	146	102	1.4314	
8	UNAM	17	28	25	35	25	16	146	102	1.4314	
10	Guadalajara	19	32	22	25	30	15	143	102	1.402	
11	Tijuana	0	0	0	0	18	28	46	34	1.3529	
12	Chiapas	19	19	25	14	26	27	130	102	1.2745	
13	Puebla	26	19	19	18	22	19	123	102	1.2059	
14	San Luis	21	14	26	21	24	12	118	102	1.1569	
15	Atlante	23	16	16	27	19	16	117	102	1.1471	
16	Querétaro	18	21	19	16	26	12	112	102	1.098	
17	Atlas	18	24	13	23	12	20	110	102	1.0784	
18	Estudiantes (R)	20	19	15	17	18	12	101	102	0.9902	Relegation

Updated to games played on April 29, 2012
