= Miguel Ángel Tejeda =

Mexican footballer (born 1994)

Miguel Angel Tejeda
Personal information
- Full name: Miguel Angel Tejeda Ramirez
- Date of birth: 21 September 1994 (age 32)
- Place of birth: Colima, Mexico
- Height: 1.81 m (5 ft 11 in)
- Position: Goalkeeper

Senior career*
Years	Team	Apps	(Gls)
2012–2019	Loros UdeC	190	(0)
2020–2022	Colima	30	(0)
- * Club domestic league appearances and goals as of 27 October 2022

Miguel Ángel Tejeda Ramírez (born September 21, 1994) is a Mexican footballer.
