= Gastélum =

Gastélum is a surname. Notable people with the surname include:

- Alejandra León Gastélum (born 1976), Mexican politician
- Bernardo J. Gastélum (1886–1981), Mexican physician, politician and writer
- Diva Hadamira Gastélum (born 1961), Mexican politician
- Jorge Gastélum (born 1988), Mexican footballer
- Juan Manuel Gastélum (1954–2025), Mexican politician
- Kelvin Gastelum (born 1991), American mixed martial artist
