= 4th federal electoral district of Sinaloa =

Federal electoral district of Mexico

Sinaloa's 4th
- Electoral district of the Chamber of Deputies of Mexico

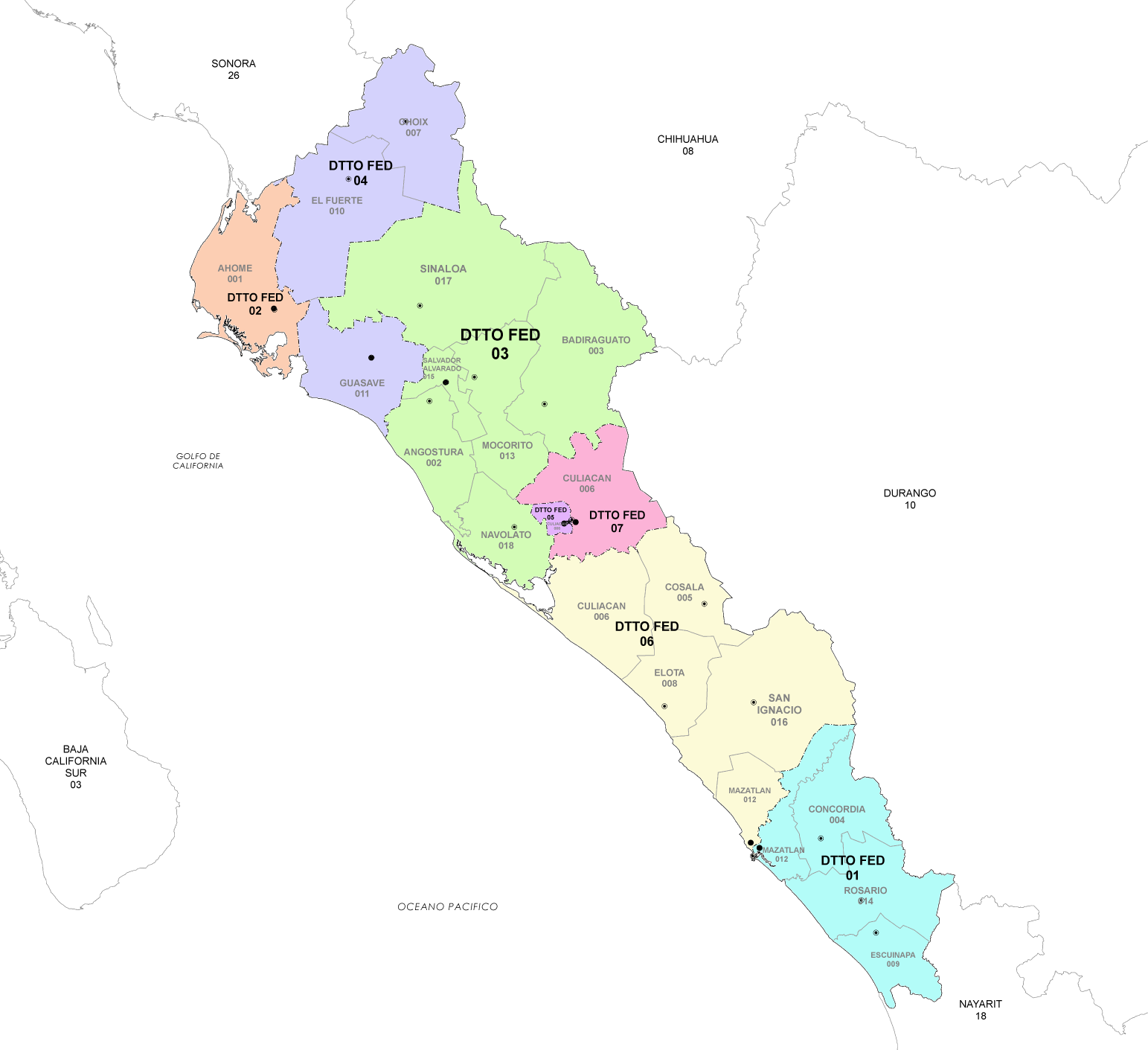
- 4th district since 2017

Incumbent
- Member: Felicita Pompa Robles
- Party: ▌Morena
- Congress: 66th (2024–2027)

District
- State: Sinaloa
- Head town: Guasave
- Coordinates: 25°34′N 108°28′W
- Covers: Choix, El Fuerte, Guasave
- PR region: First
- Precincts: 677
- Population: 413,974 (2020 census)

The 4th federal electoral district of Sinaloa (Spanish: Distrito electoral federal 04 de Sinaloa) is one of the 300 electoral districts into which Mexico is divided for elections to the federal Chamber of Deputies and one of seven such districts in the state of Sinaloa.

It elects one deputy to the lower house of Congress for each three-year legislative session by means of the first-past-the-post system. Votes cast in the district also count towards the calculation of proportional representation ("plurinominal") deputies elected from the first region.

The current member for the district, elected in the 2024 general election, is Felicita Pompa Robles of the National Regeneration Movement (Morena).

== District territory ==
Under the 2023 districting plan adopted by the National Electoral Institute (INE), which is to be used for the 2024, 2027 and 2030 federal elections, the fourth district is located in the north of the state and covers 677 electoral precincts (secciones electorales) across three municipalities:

- Choix, El Fuerte and Guasave.

The head town (cabecera distrital), where results from individual polling stations are gathered together and tallied, is the city of Guasave. The district reported a population of 413,974 in the 2020 census.

== Previous districting schemes ==
Evolution of electoral district numbers
	1974	1978	1996	2005	2017	2023
Sinaloa	5	9	8	8	7	7
Chamber of Deputies	196	300				

2017–2022

The municipalities of Choix, El Fuerte and Guasave, as under the 2023 plan. The head town was at Guasave.

1996–2017

Under both the 1996 and 2005 plans, the 4th district comprised the municipality of Guasave in its entirety.

1978–1996

The districting scheme in force from 1978 to 1996 was the result of the 1977 electoral reforms, which increased the number of single-member seats in the Chamber of Deputies from 196 to 300. Under that plan, Sinaloa's seat allocation rose from five to nine. The 4th district comprised portions of the port city of Mazatlán and of its surrounding municipality, (Note: Under the 1978 plan, the 5th district covered the remainder of Mazatlán.) together with the municipalities of Concordia, Escuinapa and Rosario.

== Deputies returned to Congress ==
(Mexico) National parties
- Current
- PAN
- PRI
- PT
- PVEM
- MC
- Morena
- PAZ
- Somos
- Defunct or local only
- PLM
- PNR
- PRM
- PNM
- PP
- PPS
- PARM
- PFCRN
- CON
- PANAL
- PSD
- PES
- PES
- PRD

Sinaloa's 4th district
Election	Deputy	Party	Term	Legislature
1916	Cándido Avilés Isunza		1916–1917	Constituent Congress of Querétaro
...
1955	Leopoldo Sánchez Celis	Institutional Revolutionary Party	1955–1958	43rd Congress
...
1973	Salvador Robles Quintero	Institutional Revolutionary Party	1973–1976	49th Congress
1976	Antonio Toledo Corro	Institutional Revolutionary Party	1976–1979	50th Congress
1979	Héctor Enrique González Guevara	Institutional Revolutionary Party	1979–1982	51st Congress
1982	Germinal Arámburo Cristerna	Institutional Revolutionary Party	1982–1985	52nd Congress
1985	Diego Valadés Ríos	Institutional Revolutionary Party	1985–1988	53rd Congress
1988	Juan Rodolfo López Monroy	Institutional Revolutionary Party	1988–1991	54th Congress
1991	Juan Sigfrido Millán Lizárraga	Institutional Revolutionary Party	1991–1994	55th Congress
1994	Jesús Manuel Meléndez Franco	Institutional Revolutionary Party	1994–1997	56th Congress
1997	Manuel Cárdenas Fonseca	Institutional Revolutionary Party	1997–2000	57th Congress
2000	Jesús Burgos Pinto	Institutional Revolutionary Party	2000–2003	58th Congress
2003	Armando Leyson Castro	Institutional Revolutionary Party	2003–2006	59th Congress
2006	Ramón Barajas López	Institutional Revolutionary Party	2006–2009	60th Congress
2009	Diva Hadamira Gastelum Bajo	Institutional Revolutionary Party	2009–2012	61st Congress
2012	Blas Ramón Rubio Lara	Institutional Revolutionary Party	2012–2015	62nd Congress
2015	Jesús Antonio López Rodríguez (Note: López Rodríguez took a leave of absence from his seat from March to June 2018, during which he was replaced by his alternate, De Anda Mata.); Juan Luis de Anda Mata	National Action Party (Mexico)	2015–2018; 2018	63rd Congress
2018	Casimiro Zamora Valdez	National Regeneration Movement	2018–2021	64th Congress
2021	Casimiro Zamora Valdez	National Regeneration Movement	2021–2024	65th Congress
2024	Felicita Pompa Robles	National Regeneration Movement	2024–2027	66th Congress

== Presidential elections ==
Sinaloa's xth district
Election	District won by	Party or coalition	%
2018	Andrés Manuel López Obrador	Juntos Haremos Historia	65.0879
2024	Claudia Sheinbaum Pardo	Sigamos Haciendo Historia	71.3534
