= Armando Leyson =

Mexican politician

- Born: 28 September 1956 (age 69); Guasave, Sinaloa, Mexico
- Occupation: Politician
- Political party: PRI

Armando Leyson Castro (born 28 September 1956) is a Mexican politician affiliated with the Institutional Revolutionary Party (PRI).

Leyson was the municipal president of Guasave from 1999 to 2001 and, in the 2003 mid-terms, he was elected to the Chamber of Deputies to represent Sinaloa's 4th district during the 59th session of Congress. He also served as president of the Diablos Azules de Guasave football team and vice president of the Algodoneros de Guasave baseball team.

Leyson comes from a political family. His father, Miguel Leyson Pérez, served as a federal deputy in the 47th Congress as well as the municipal president of Guasave from 1943 to 1944. His brother, José Luis Leyson Castro, was a federal deputy in the 56th Congress and municipal president of Guasave from 1984 to 1986.
