= Hugo Bueno =

Hugo Bueno may refer to:

- Hugo Bueno (footballer, born 1992), Mexican football midfielder
- Hugo Bueno (footballer, born 2002), Spanish football defender for Wolves
