= Sergio Bueno (footballer, born 1997) =

Mexican professional footballer

Sergio Bueno Jr.
Personal information
- Full name: Sergio Bueno Pedraza
- Date of birth: 26 January 1997 (age 29)
- Place of birth: Mexico City, Mexico
- Height: 1.73 m (5 ft 8 in)
- Position: Midfielder

Team information
- Current team: Colima
- Number: 13

Youth career
- 2009: Santos Laguna
- 2012: Vaqueros
- 2014–2015: Guadalajara
- 2015: Cruz Azul
- 2016: Atlas
- 2017: Chiapas
- 2017: Necaxa

Senior career*
Years	Team	Apps	(Gls)
2018	Atlante	4	(0)
2020–	Colima	129	(19)
- * Club domestic league appearances and goals as of 11 January 2026 ‡ National team caps and goals as of 15 March 2021

Sergio Bueno Pedraza (born 26 January 1997) is a Mexican professional footballer who plays as a midfielder for Colima.

== Personal life ==
Bueno's father, also named Sergio, is a football manager and former footballer.
