= Ramón Barajas López =

Mexican politician

- Born: 29 January 1966 (age 60); Sinaloa, Mexico
- Occupation: Politician
- Political party: PRI

Ramón Barajas López (born 29 January 1966) is a Mexican politician from the Institutional Revolutionary Party (PRI). In the 2006 general election he was elected to the Chamber of Deputies to represent Sinaloa's 4th district during the 60th session of Congress.
