= Kevin Chaurand =

Mexican footballer (born 1995)

Personal information
- Full name: Kevin Henry Chaurand Peasland
- Date of birth: 29 March 1995 (age 31)
- Place of birth: Celaya, Guanajuato, Mexico
- Height: 1.77 m (5 ft 9 1/2 in)
- Position: Forward

Team information
- Current team: Once Deportivo

Senior career*
| Years | Team | Apps | (Gls) |
| 2011–2014 | Celaya | 40 | (4) |
| 2014–2016 | Necaxa | 28 | (6) |
| 2016 | → Lobos de la BUAP (loan) | 7 | (0) |
| 2017–2018 | Murciélagos | 20 | (2) |
| 2018 | Atlético Reynosa | 15 | (2) |
| 2018 | Club Atlético Zacatepec | 6 | (1) |
| 2019–2020 | Atlético Reynosa | 5 | (0) |
| 2020–2021 | Colima | 16 | (8) |
| 2021–2022 | Saltillo | 13 | (10) |
| 2022–2023 | Zacatecas | 53 | (8) |
| 2024– | Once Deportivo | 0 | (0) |
- * Club domestic league appearances and goals as of 25 June 2022

Kevin Henry Chaurand Peasland (born 29 March 1995) is a Mexican professional footballer who plays as forward for Colima F.C.
