= Manuel Cárdenas Fonseca =

Mexican politician (born 1958)

- Born: 13 February 1958 (age 68); Guasave, Sinaloa, Mexico
- Education: UNAM
- Occupation: Politician
- Political party: PRI, PANAL

Manuel Cárdenas Fonseca (born 13 February 1958) is a Mexican politician. At different times he has been affiliated with both the Institutional Revolutionary Party (PRI) and the New Alliance Party (PANAL).

In the 1997 mid-terms he was elected to the Chamber of Deputies to represent Sinaloa's 4th district during the 57th Congress on the PRI ticket. Subsequently, in the 2006 general election, he was elected as a plurinominal deputy for the first region, representing the PANAL during the 60th Congress.
