= Campo Cuatro Milpas Airport =

Airfield in Guasave, Sinaloa, Mexico

Guasave Airfield Aeropuerto de Guasave
- IATA: none; ICAO: MM52; LID: CMG

Summary
- Airport type: Public
- Serves: Guasave, Sinaloa, Mexico
- Time zone: MST (UTC−07:00)
- Elevation AMSL: 28 m (92 ft)
- Coordinates: 25°39′08″N 108°32′17″W

Map
- Location of the airport in Sinaloa MM52 (Mexico)

Runways
Direction	Length		Surface
Direction	m	ft	Surface
09/27	1,969	6,460	Asphalt

Statistics (2023)
- Total passengers: N/A
- Source: Agencia Federal de Aviación Civil

Guasave Airfield, (Spanish: Aeropuerto de Guasave), also known as Aeropuerto Nacional Campo Cuatro Milpas (Campo Cuatro Milpas National Airport) or Aeródromo Camagüey (Camagüey Airfield) (ICAO: MM52, FAA LID: CMG), is a small airstrip located in Guasave, the fourth-largest city in the state of Sinaloa, Mexico. It handles domestic air traffic for the city of Guasave.

It is situated at an elevation of 28 metres (92 ft) above mean sea level, featuring a single asphalt runway, designated as 09/27, measuring 1,969 by 25 metres (6,460 by 82 ft). Adjacent facilities include small hangars and unpaved parking positions for aircraft. Over the years, it has experienced intermittent service by regional airlines, offering seasonal flights within the region.

== See also ==
- List of the busiest airports in Mexico
- List of airports in Mexico
- List of airports by ICAO code: M
- List of busiest airports in North America
- List of the busiest airports in Latin America
- Transportation in Mexico
- Tourism in Mexico
