= Diego Aguilar Acuña =

Mexican politician

- Born: 13 November 1946 (age 79); Guasave, Sinaloa, Mexico
- Occupation: Politician
- Political party: PRI

Diego Aguilar Acuña (born 13 November 1946) is a Mexican politician from the Institutional Revolutionary Party. He has served as Deputy of the LVII and LX Legislatures of the Mexican Congress representing Sinaloa.
