= Jesús Burgos Pinto =

Mexican politician

- Born: 3 August 1953 (age 73); Guasave, Sinaloa, Mexico
- Education: Autonomous University of Sinaloa
- Occupation: Politician
- Political party: PRI
- Family: Juan Burgos Pinto (brother)

Jesús Burgos Pinto (born 3 August 1953) is a Mexican politician from the Institutional Revolutionary Party (PRI). In the 2000 general election he was elected to the Chamber of Deputies to represent Sinaloa's 4th district during the 58th session of Congress. He also served as a local deputy in the 55th and 58th sessions of the Congress of Sinaloa, as well as the municipal president of Guasave from 2007 to 2010.

Burgos Pinto earned his Licentiate in law at the Autonomous University of Sinaloa in 1967. His brother, Juan Burgos Pinto, was also a politician.
