= Blas Ramón Rubio Lara =

Mexican politician

- Born: 13 December 1950 (age 75); Guasave, Sinaloa, Mexico
- Occupation: Politician
- Political party: PRI

Blas Ramón Rubio Lara (born 13 December 1950) is a Mexican politician affiliated with the Institutional Revolutionary Party (PRI). In the 2012 general election he was elected to the Chamber of Deputies to represent Sinaloa's 4th district during the 62nd session of Congress. He was also a local deputy during the 56th and 60th sessions of the Congress of Sinaloa.
