= Hugo Bueno (footballer, born 1992) =

Mexican footballer (born 1992)

Personal information
- Full name: Hugo Bueno Sánchez
- Date of birth: February 16, 1992 (age 34)
- Place of birth: Colima City, Mexico
- Height: 1.73 m (5 ft 8 in)
- Position: Midfielder

Senior career*
Years	Team	Apps	(Gls)
2013–2015	Chiapas	3	(0)
2015–2016	Venados	0	(0)
Total		3	(0)
- * Club domestic league appearances and goals

Hugo Bueno Sánchez (born February 16, 1992) is a Mexican former professional footballer who played as a midfielder.

Despite never playing for the club, Bueno was inducted into the Colima F.C. Hall of Fame in 2021 for his contributions to sport in Colima.
