= José Luis Salgado =

Mexican footballer and manager (born 1966)

Personal information
- Full name: José Luis Salgado Gómez
- Date of birth: 3 April 1966 (age 60)
- Place of birth: Mexico City, Mexico
- Position: Defender

Senior career*
Years	Team	Apps	(Gls)
1985–1990	UNAM	127	(3)
1990–1991	UAG	19	(0)
1991–1992	Monterrey	6	(0)
1992–1995	UAG	102	(3)
1995–2000	América	119	(3)
2001	León	17	(0)
2001–2002	Morelia	9	(0)
Total		399	(9)

International career
1987–1995	Mexico	3	(0)
- * Club domestic league appearances and goals

José Luis Salgado Gómez (Note: In this Spanish name, the first or paternal surname is Salgado and the second or maternal family name is Gómez.) (born 3 April 1966) is a Mexican former footballer and manager.

== Career ==
Salgado began playing professional football with Pumas UNAM, making his Primera debut in 1985, and subsequently playing for Tecos, C.F. Monterrey, Club América, Club León, and Atlético Morelia. He also played for the Mexico national football team, and was a participant at the 1994 FIFA World Cup.

After he retired from playing, Salgado became a football manager. He led Pumas Morelos in the Primera A. Salgado was interim manager for Estudiantes Tecos for the final match of the Apertura 2011 season, before briefly managing the club in the Clausura 2012 season.
