= Sergio Bueno =

Mexican footballer and manager (born 1962)

Sergio Bueno Rodríguez
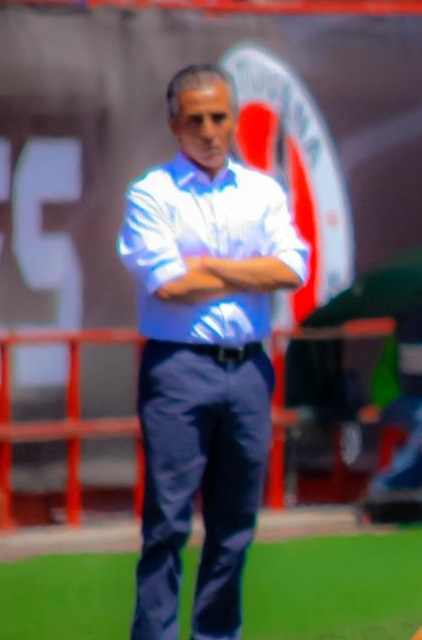

Personal information
- Full name: Sergio Bueno Rodríguez
- Date of birth: 4 July 1962 (age 64)
- Place of birth: Colima, Mexico
- Height: 1.74 m (5 ft 8 1/2 in)
- Position: Defender

Senior career*
Years	Team	Apps	(Gls)
1983–1988	Neza	99	(3)
1988–1989	Atlante	29	(2)
1990–1991	Querétaro	35	(1)
1991–1992	Atlético Morelia	27	(1)
1992–1994	Querétaro	67	(2)
1994–1995	Veracruz	14	(0)
1995–1996	Celaya	7	(1)
1996–1997	Puebla	15	(2)

Managerial career
- 2001–2002: Celaya
- 2002: Santos Laguna
- 2003: Chiapas
- 2003–2005: Atlas
- 2006: Morelia
- 2007–2008: León
- 2009: Santos Laguna
- 2010: Veracruz
- 2011: Necaxa
- 2011: Puebla
- 2012: San Luis
- 2012–2013: Querétaro
- 2013–2015: Chiapas
- 2015: Cruz Azul
- 2016–2017: Chiapas
- 2017–2018: Atlante
- 2024–2026: Colima
- 2026: Mazatlán
- * Club domestic league appearances and goals

Sergio Bueno Rodríguez (born 4 July 1962) is a Mexican football manager and former professional footballer.

== Managerial career ==
=== Early career ===
Between 1999 and 2001, Bueno began his coaching career as an assistant coach to Rubén Omar Romano at Celaya and Tecos. He also worked alongside Miguel Ángel López at Celaya during the Invierno 2001 tournament.

=== Celaya (2001–2002) ===
Bueno made his debut as head coach following the departure of Miguel Ángel López. In his first match, Celaya defeated Morelia 5–2. He successfully helped the club to preserve its top-flight status at the end of the 2001–02 season.

=== Santos Laguna (2002 and 2009) ===
He had two spells in charge of Santos Laguna. His first, during the Apertura 2002, ended after seven matches. He returned in March 2009 and led the club to the Apertura 2009 playoffs, where Santos was eliminated in the quarterfinals. He was dismissed in December of that year.

=== Jaguares de Chiapas (2003, 2013–2015, and 2016–2017) ===
Bueno managed Jaguares de Chiapas in three separate spells. During his first tenure, he secured the club's place in the top division. In his second stint, Jaguares once again avoided relegation, qualified for the Apertura 2014 playoffs, and reached the Copa MX semifinals. He returned in 2016 for a third spell, which ended with the club's relegation in 2017.

=== Atlas (2003–2005) ===
He took over as head coach of Atlas in September 2003 and guided them to two consecutive playoff appearances. During the Apertura 2004, the team reached the semifinals before being eliminated by UNAM. He remained with the club until April 2005.

=== Atlante (2005 and 2017–2018) ===
Bueno managed Atlante in two different periods. During his second spell, he led the club to the Clausura 2018 playoffs before leaving his position.

=== León (2006–2008) ===
He coached León in the Primera División "A" for two seasons. He led the team to the Clausura 2008 final, where they triumphed over Dorados de Sinaloa to be crowned champions. However, a week later, León faced Indios de Juárez in the promotion final and suffered defeat. Days later, Bueno left his post.

=== Veracruz and others (2010–2013) ===
In July 2010, Bueno took over at Veracruz. He managed eight games of the Apertura 2010 before being relieved of his duties. Over the following years, he managed Necaxa, Puebla, San Luis, and Querétaro, but without much success.

=== Cruz Azul (2015) ===
Bueno was appointed head coach of Cruz Azul for the Apertura 2015. He managed 16 official matches before leaving the club in September of that year.

=== Colima (2020–2026) ===
In March 2020, Bueno founded Colima Fútbol Club in the Liga Premier and became the club's president. In February 2024, he returned to coaching as the team's manager, stepping down from his executive role. He remained in charge until January 2026.

=== Mazatlán (2026) ===
In January 2026, Bueno was appointed head coach of Mazatlán, marking his return to the top division after nine years. At the end of the Clausura 2026, he left the club following its dissolution.

== Personal life ==
Bueno's son, also named Sergio, is also a professional footballer.

== Managerial statistics ==
As of 3 March 2026

Team	From	To	Record					Ref
Team	From	To	M	W	D	L	Win %	Ref
Atlético Celaya	June 2001	May 2002	23	8	5	10	34.8	
Santos Laguna	June 2002	December 2002	7	1	1	5	14.3	
Chiapas	January 2003	May 2003	10	3	2	5	30.0	
Atlas	June 2003	May 2005	63	20	19	24	31.7	
Atlante	June 2005	December 2005	9	3	1	5	33.3	
Morelia	January 2006	May 2006	4	0	1	3	0.0	
León	January 2007	May 2008	63	35	19	9	55.6	
Santos Laguna	25 March 2009	November 2009	25	11	8	6	44.0	
Veracruz	July 2010	September 2010	8	3	5	0	37.5	
Necaxa	31 January 2011	April 2011	10	2	5	3	20.0	
Puebla	13 May 2011	7 November 2011	17	6	4	7	35.3	
San Luis	28 February 2012	29 April 2012	9	1	2	6	11.1	
Querétaro	4 September 2012	4 February 2013	18	4	6	8	22.2	
Chiapas	5 June 2013	May 2015	96	34	29	33	35.4	
Cruz Azul	1 June 2015	28 September 2015	16	7	1	8	43.8	
Chiapas	18 September 2016	May 2017	29	8	7	14	27.6	
Atlante	13 November 2017	25 May 2018	14	6	4	4	42.86	
Colima	4 February 2024	20 January 2026	55	8	3	44	14.55	
Mazatlán	20 January 2026	25 April 2026	13	4	2	7	30.77	
Total			489	164	124	201	33.5	

Last updated: 26 April 2026.
Source: Liga MX
