= Corsarios de Campeche =

Mexican football club

- Full name: Club de Fútbol Corsarios de Campeche
- Nickname: Los Corsarios (The Corsairs)
- Founded: 6 September 1981; 44 years ago
- Ground: Estadio Universitario de Campeche; Campeche, Campeche
- Capacity: 4,000
- Chairman: Fernando Medina Fuentes
- Manager: Fernando Aguilar Varguez
- League: Liga TDP - Group I
- 2021–22: Current
Home colours	Away colours

Club de Fútbol Corsarios de Campeche is a Mexican football club based in the city of Campeche, Campeche that competes in the Tercera División de México, the bottom level division of Mexican football. The club was founded on September 6, 1981 and plays their home team matches at the Estadio Universitario de Campeche.

== See also ==
- Football in Mexico
- Tercera División de México
