= Diva Hadamira Gastélum =

Mexican politician

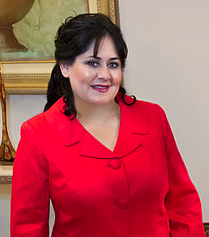
- Diva Hadamira Gastélum Bajo, 2012
- Born: 30 July 1961 (age 65); Guasave, Sinaloa, Mexico
- Occupation: Politician
- Political party: PRI

Diva Hadamira Gastélum Bajo (born 30 July 1961) is a Mexican politician affiliated with the Institutional Revolutionary Party (PRI).

She has served in both chambers of Congress: in the 2009 mid-terms she was elected to the Chamber of Deputies to represent Sinaloa's 4th district during the 61st Congress, and in the 2012 general election she was elected to the Senate as a national-list senator, where she served during the 62nd and 63rd Congresses.
