= Diablos Azules de Guasave =

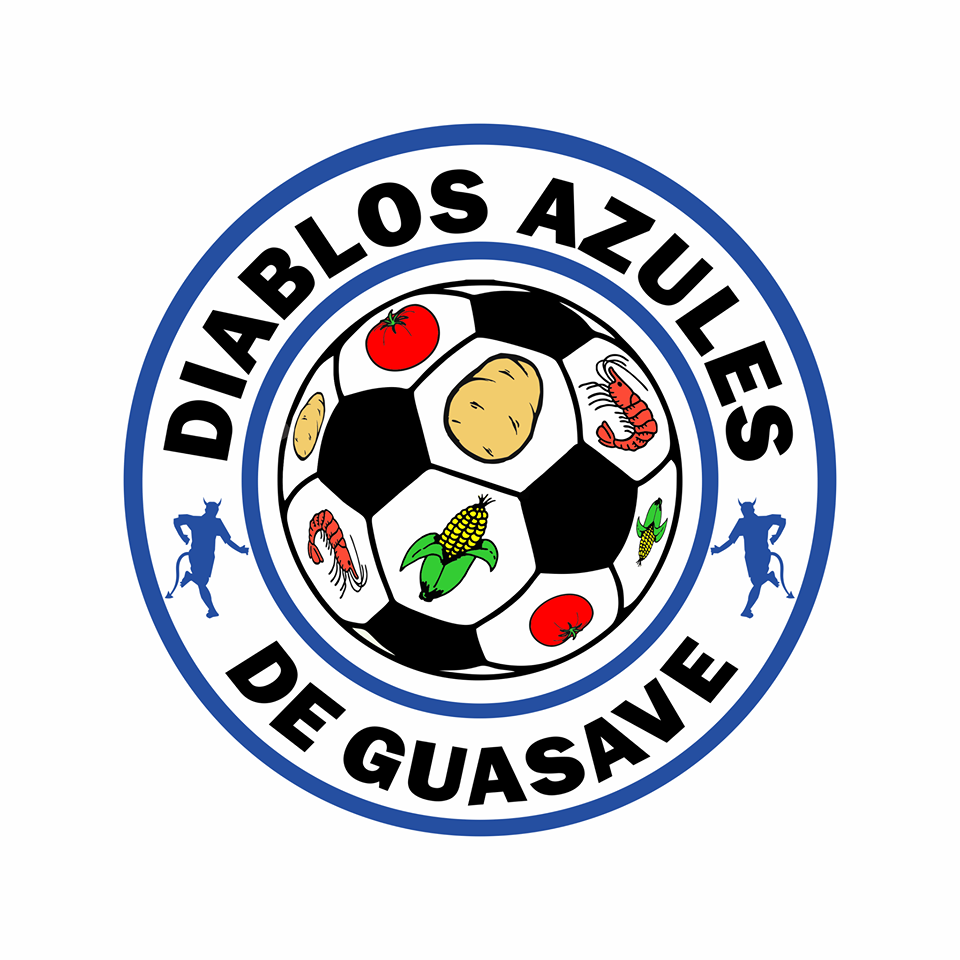
- Full name: Club de Fútbol Diablos Azules de Guasave
- Founded: 1985; 41 years ago
- Dissolved: 2018; 8 years ago
- Ground: Estadio Armando "Kory" Leyson; Guasave, Sinaloa
- Capacity: 9,000
- Chairman: Pablo Valdez
- Manager: Rosario Santos
- League: Tercera División de México
| Home colours | Away colours |

Club de Fútbol Diablos Azules de Guasave was a Mexican football club that played in the Tercera División de México. The club was based in Guasave, Sinaloa and was founded in 1985.

== See also ==
- Football in Mexico
- Tercera División de México
