= René García (footballer, born 1961) =

Mexican footballer and manager

Personal information
- Full name: René Isidoro García Alvarado
- Date of birth: 4 April 1961 (age 65)
- Place of birth: San Luis Potosi, Mexico
- Position: Striker

Senior career*
Years	Team	Apps	(Gls)
1986–1988	Atlético Potosino		
1988–1989	Atlante		
1989–1990	Atlas		
1990–1991	UAT		
1991–1994	Atlante		
1994–1995	Tampico Madero		
1995–1996	Puebla		
1996	Pachuca CF		

Managerial career
- 2003–2005: Atlas (Assistant)
- 2006: Atlante
- 2007: Mexico U-23 (Interim)
- 2007–2008: Chiapas
- 2008–2009: Cruz Azul (Assistant)
- 2009: Santos Laguna (Assistant)
- 2010: Atlante
- 2011–2012: San Luis
- 2012–2013: Querétaro (Assistant)
- 2013–2015: Chiapas (Assistant)
- 2015: Cruz Azul (Assistant)
- 2016–2017: Chiapas (Assistant)
- 2018: Atlante (Assistant)
- 2018–2019: Veracruz U-20
- 2020–2022: Colima
- 2026: Mazatlán (Assistant)
- * Club domestic league appearances and goals

René Isidoro García Alvarado (born 4 April 1961) is a Mexican retired footballer and former manager of Atlante of the Primera División de México.

== Playing career ==
Born in San Luis Potosi, García began playing football with local side Atlético Potosino. He would also play for Atlante F.C., Club Atlas, Correcaminos UAT, Puebla F.C. and Pachuca F.C. Also, he played for Tampico Madero in the 1994-95 season.

== Managerial career ==
He was manager of Atlante, Chiapas and San Luis and also coached at Celaya, Santos Laguna, Cruz Azul and Querétaro.

== See also ==
- MACÍAS CABRERA, Fernando (2007). Fútbol Profesional en México Primera División 1943 - 2007., Editorial Independiente edición, México.
