= Gilberto Adame =

Mexican footballer and manager (born 1972)

Personal information
- Full name: Gilberto Adame Soltero
- Date of birth: 31 May 1972 (age 54)
- Place of birth: Guadalajara, Jalisco, Mexico
- Height: 1.68 m (5 ft 6 in)
- Position: Defender

Senior career*
Years	Team	Apps	(Gls)
1991–1992	Atlas	6	(0)
1992–1994	Tecomán	26	(3)
1995–2003	Tecos UAG	203	(7)
2002	→ Guadalajara (loan)	16	(0)
2003–2004	León	34	(3)
2004–2005	Querétaro	39	(0)
2005–2006	Irapuato	35	(5)
2006	Tecos UAG	6	(0)
2007	Tijuana	17	(0)
2007	Tampico Madero	17	(0)

International career
2000	Mexico	1	(0)

Managerial career
- 2008: Querétaro (Assistant)
- 2010: Estudiantes Tecos (Assistant)
- 2011: Santos Laguna U–20
- 2011–2012: Estudiantes Tecos (Assistant)
- 2012–2013: Morelia (Assistant)
- 2013–2014: Puebla (Assistant)
- 2015: Tijuana (Assistant)
- 2017–2022: América (Assistant)
- 2023–2025: Mazatlán (Assistant)
- 2024: Mazatlán (Interim)
- 2025: Atlético Morelia
- * Club domestic league appearances and goals as of 17:16 UTC, 9 June 2025

Gilberto Adame Soltero (born May 31, 1972), known as Gilberto Adame, is a Mexican football former player and manager.
