= Jorge Almaguer =

Mexican footballer (born 1994)

Personal information
- Full name: Jorge Luis Almaguer Ruíz
- Date of birth: 2 March 1994 (age 32)
- Place of birth: León, Guanajuato, Mexico
- Height: 1.75 m (5 ft 9 in)
- Positions: Attacking midfielder; attacking midfielder

Youth career
- 2007–2010: Cabezas Rojas
- 2010: Real Leonés
- 2010–2011: Atlético ECCA

Senior career*
| Years | Team | Apps | (Gls) |
| 2011 | Atlético San Francisco | 9 | (3) |
| 2012–2014 | Celaya | 60 | (17) |
| 2015–2018 | Irapuato | 89 | (19) |
| 2018–2019 | UdeC | 33 | (5) |
| 2019 | UAEM | 4 | (0) |
| 2020 | Coras Nayarit | 10 | (6) |
| 2020–2021 | Colima | 18 | (4) |
- * Club domestic league appearances and goals as of 15 March 2021

Jorge Luis Almaguer Ruíz (born March 2, 1994) is a Mexican professional footballer who plays for Colima.
