= Estadio Armando "Kory" Leyson =

Multi-use stadium in Guasave, Sinaloa, Mexico

Coordinates: 25°34′56.5″N 108°28′42.5″W

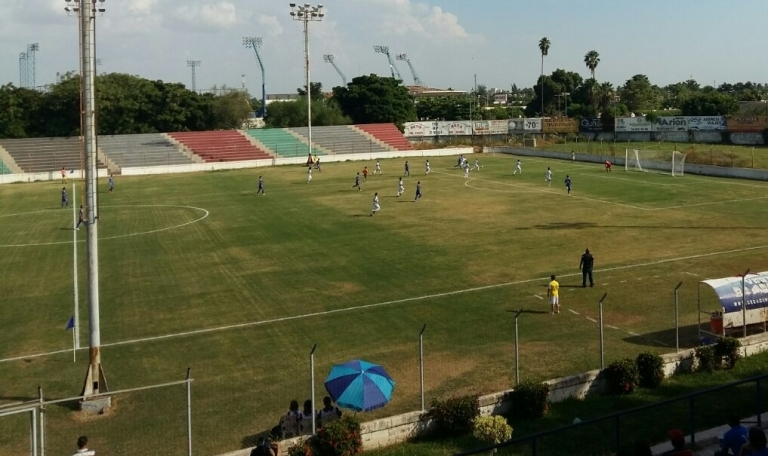
A picture of the stadium grounds

The Estadio Armando "Kory" Leyson is a multi-use stadium in Guasave, Sinaloa. It is currently used mostly for football matches and is the home stadium for Agricultores F.C. Guasave The stadium has a capacity of 9,000 people.
