= Colima F.C. =

Mexican association football club

Colima FC
- Full name: Colima Fútbol Club
- Nickname: Los Caimanes (The Alligators)
- Founded: 12 March 2020; 6 years ago
- Ground: Estadio Colima; Colima, Colima
- Capacity: 12,000
- Owner: Sergio Bueno
- Chairman: Daniela Bueno
- Manager: Juan Francisco Cordero (interim)
- League: Liga Premier (Serie A)
- 2025–26: Regular phase: 14th (Group I); Final phase: Did not qualify
- Website: http://colimafc.mx/
Home colours	Away colours	Third colours

Colima Fútbol Club is a Mexican professional football club based in the city of Colima, Colima, that competes in the Liga Premier - Serie A, the third level division of Mexican football.

== History ==
In December 2019, Loros UdeC was dissolved after the death of its owner, Jimmy Goldsmith, which left the city of Colima without a professional football team.

At the beginning of 2020, Sergio Bueno, a football manager born in the city, began a project to return football to the city with the aim of getting a promotion to higher categories of the Federación Mexicana de Fútbol (FMF). On March 12, 2020, the club's registration with the Federación Mexicana de Fútbol became official, which is why it is considered as the founding date of Colima F.C. In June, an agreement was signed between the University of Colima and an association for the use of the Estadio Olímpico Universitario de Colima by a new football team.

On July 17, 2020, the team's participation in the Segunda División de México was announced. On July 29, it was announced that the team would be part of Group 1 along with other teams from the northern and western areas of Mexico. On August 20, René Isidoro García was officially announced as the first coach in the club's history, and on the same day, it was announced that the club would seek to have a development area for youth footballers and a women's team.

On September 19, 2020, Colima F.C. played its first official match. The team defeated Gavilanes de Matamoros 2–0. Jorge Almaguer scored the first goal in the club's history.

In July 2026, the club requested not to participate in the 2026–27 season, though without announcing the reasons that led it to request the hiatus.

== Stadium ==
The Estadio Olímpico Universitario de Colima is a multi-use stadium in Colima City, Colima, Mexico. It is currently used mostly for football matches and is the home stadium for Colima Fútbol Club. The stadium has a capacity of 11,812 people and opened in 1994.

Since the 2023-24 season, the team has also used the Estadio Colima, which has a capacity for 12,000 spectators and was inaugurated in 1976.

== Players ==
=== First-team squad ===
As of 11 January 2026

Note: Flags indicate national team as defined under FIFA eligibility rules; some limited exceptions apply. Players may hold more than one non-FIFA nationality.

No.	Pos.	Nation	Player
1	GK	MEX	Jesús Hernández
2	DF	MEX	Bryan Alcázar
3	DF	MEX	Marco Pérez
4	DF	MEX	Óscar Regalado
5	DF	MEX	Raúl Bueno
6	DF	MEX	Luis Torres
7	FW	MEX	Fabián Cruz
8	MF	MEX	Alan Galindo
10	FW	MEX	Joshua Ochoa
11	GK	MEX	Carlos Rodríguez
13	FW	MEX	Sergio Bueno
14	FW	MEX	Rafael Ortega

No.	Pos.	Nation	Player
15	DF	MEX	Pablo Cortés
16	MF	MEX	Abraham Álvarez
17	FW	MEX	Anderson Hernández
18	MF	MEX	Daniel Medina
19	MF	COL	Faiber Perlaza
20	MF	USA	Óscar Pérez
21	DF	MEX	Armando Álvarez
22	MF	MEX	Manuel Peralta
23	GK	MEX	Jason Ávalos
24	DF	MEX	Wilberth Martínez
33	GK	MEX	Yosmar Reyes

== Managers ==
- (Mexico) René Isidoro García (2020–2022)
- (Mexico) Ernesto Santana (2022)
- (Mexico) Usiel Andrade (2022–2023)
- (Mexico) Juan Francisco Cordero (Interim) (2023–2024)
- (Mexico) Sergio Bueno (2024–2026)
- (Mexico) Juan Francisco Cordero (Interim) (2026–)
