= Guasave =

City in the Mexican state of Sinaloa

Guasave, Sinaloa
- City
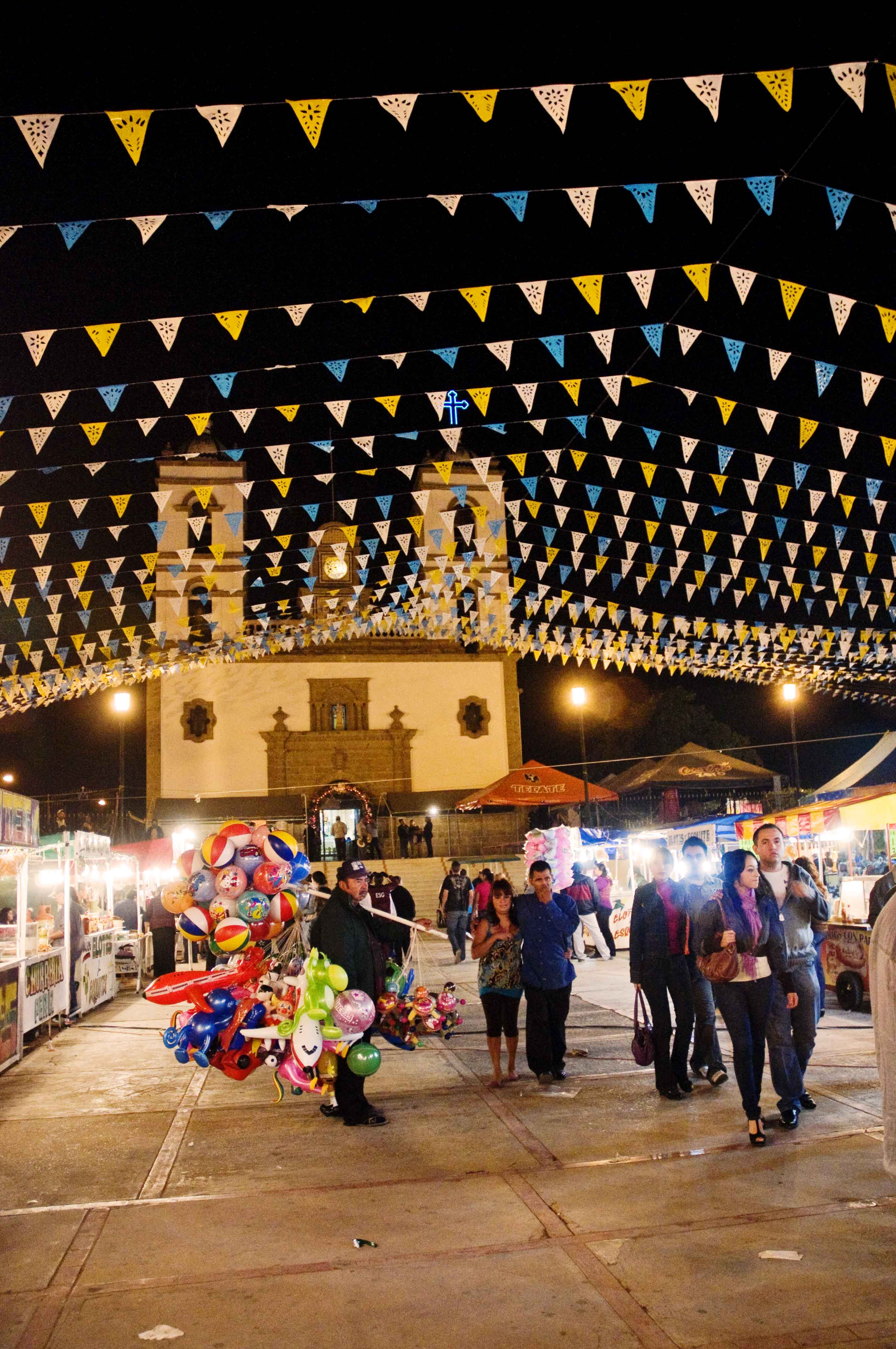
- Church of Our Lady of the Rosary

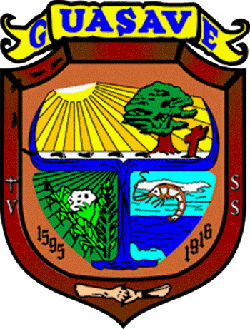
- Coat of arms
- Nickname: The Agricultural Heart of Mexico
- Interactive map of Guasave, Sinaloa
- Location in Mexico Guasave (Mexico)
- Coordinates: 25°34′28″N 108°28′14″W
- Country: Mexico
- State: Sinaloa
- Municipality: Guasave
- Founded on: 24 June 1595
- Founded by: Hernando de Villafañe

Government
  - Mayor: Martin de Jesus Ahumada Quintero (National Regeneration Movement)
- Elevation: 27 m (89 ft)

Population (2020)
  - Total: 320,000
- Time zone: UTC-7 (Mountain Standard Time)
- Postal code: 81000 to

Guasave (Spanish pronunciation: [ɡwaˈsaβe]) is a city and the seat of the homonymous municipality known as the Agricultural Heart of Mexico (El Corazon Agricola de Mexico) in the Mexican state of Sinaloa. It is located in the northwestern part of Mexico, 62km (38 miles) southeast of the city of Los Mochis and 150km (93 miles) northeast the state capital Culiacán. It stands at 25°34′04.5″N 108°28′10.8″W.

In the 2010 census, the city reported a population of 71,196, making it the fourth-largest community in the state, after Culiacán, Mazatlán, and Los Mochis. The municipality has a land area of 3,464.41 km^{2} (1,337.62 sq mi) and includes many other outlying communities, the largest of which are Juan José Ríos, Gabriel Leyva Solano, Adolfo Ruiz Cortines, El Burrion and Bamoa.

== Transportation ==
The Mexican Highway Number 15 (Carretera Internacional Numero 15) passes through the city north to south direction. The city is served by Campo Cuatro Milpas Airport, offering air services within the region.

== Tourist attractions ==
San Ignacio Bay and Navachiste Bay are popular for watersports. Guasave also features the viceroyalty towns as Tamazula, with its famous Franciscan era church. Nearby lie the ruins of Pueblo Viejo and Nío, which date from the time of the Jesuits from the 17th century until their expulsion in 1767. Visitors can also go to Parque Villafañe, a local park named after the city's founder.

== Sports ==
The Algodoneros ("Cotton Growers") professional baseball team of the Mexican Pacific League are based in Guasave. The football team Diablos Azules de Guasave ("Blue Devils") is part of the soccer league Tercera División de México. The basketball team Los Frailes("The Friars") is a professional team who play in CIBAPAC.

== Economy ==
Situated on the Pacific Coastal Plains in Northwest Mexico and including within limits near than half million irrigated acres agriculture is the main economical activity by far. Aquaculture is other important industry.

The agro business related activities are also important.

== Archaeology ==
The Guasave archaeological site, belonging to Capacha culture, was excavated by archaeologist Gordon Ekholm in the 1940s. It became known as the greatest formal cemetery mound in Northwest Mexico that has been excavated.

He found several pottery types including red wares, red-on-buff, finely incised wares and several types of highly detailed polychrome pottery. Also, alabaster vases and copper implements were found. Cotton textiles were also used by these peoples.

Capacha culture goes back to 2000–1500 BC.

== History ==
The Jesuit mission of San Pedro y Pablo de Guasave was founded in 1590.

== Notable people ==
- Diego Aguilar Acuña, politician, federal deputy and local deputy
- Gael Álvarez, footballer
- Jesús Burgos Pinto, politician, federal deputy and former municipal president of Guasave
- Manuel Cárdenas Fonseca, politician, federal deputy
- Florentino Castro López, politician, federal deputy
- Arnoldo Castro, baseball player, member of the Mexican Professional Baseball Hall of Fame
- Rodolfo Espinoza, footballer
- Diva Hadamira Gastélum, politician, federal deputy
- Armando Leyson, politician, federal deputy and former municipal president of Guasave
- Ángel López, footballer
- Miguel Martínez, actor and singer
- Antonio Norzagaray Ángulo, delegate to the 1916–17 Constitutional Convention, governor of Aguascalientes.
- Julio César Pardini, footballer
- Edson Reséndez, footballer
- Mario Rodríguez, boxer, former IBF world champion
- Blas Ramón Rubio Lara, politician, federal deputy
- Gilberto Sepúlveda, footballer
- Remmy Valenzuela, singer-songwriter
