= Universitarios (Culiacán) =

Universitarios Zona Universitaria, Villa Universitaria, Cd. Universitaria University Zone, University Village, City University
- Sector 5 of Culiacán
- Universitarios
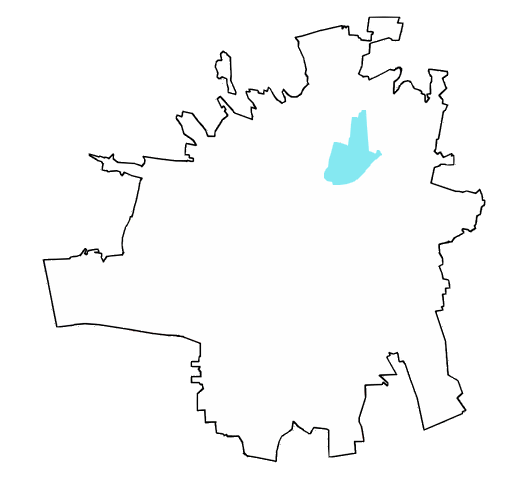
- Location of Universitarios Zone.
- Coordinates: 24°49′30″N 107°22′54″W
- Country: Mexico
- State: Sinaloa
- Municipality: Culiacán Municipality
- City: Culiacán
- Colonias of Universitarios: List: Burócrata; Chapultepec; Chapultepec del Río; Comunicadores; Fovissste; Gabriel Leyva; Grecia; La Lima; Las Americas; Lomas del Pedregal; Lomas del Sol, II, Duplex; Privada del Real; Residencial Campestre; Residencial Hacienda; Santa Margarita; Tierra Blanca
- ZIP codes: 80015, 80016, 80030, 80034 and 80040
- Website: culiacan.gob.mx

Universitarios is the fifth urban sector in the central area of Culiacán, Sinaloa, Mexico. The zone features city's City University of Autonomous University of Sinaloa, including one of the UAS High Schools campuses, the city's Botanical Garden and the Science Center of Sinaloa.

== Places of interest ==
=== Churches ===
- La Sagrada Familia (The Sacred Family)
- Cristo Rey (Christ King)

=== Parks and green areas ===
==== Culiacán Botanical Garden ====
It is a botanical garden of 10 hectares, located next to City University Culiacan, whose main functions are botanical species conservation, scientific research, environmental education and the promotion of culture and recreation.

==== Club Campestre Culiacán ====
Private club located in Chapultepec neighborhood, is a big place for events and celebrations. It has many sport fields (tennis, basketball, football, etc.), pools, an auditorium, some events halls and green areas.

==== Green areas ====
- Andrés Vidales street-Ave. J. de la Barrera-Fernando Montes de Oca street-Ave. Juan Escutia
- Parque Gabriel Leyva Ave. Álvaro Obregón
- Diamante Integral Homero street-Galileo street
- Neptuno street-Manuel Gómez street-Alberto Vázquez
