= Desarrollo Urbano Tres Ríos =

Desarrollo Urbano Tres Ríos Zona del Río, Desarrollo Tres Ríos River Zone, Three Rivers Development
- Sector 6 of Culiacán
- Tres Ríos
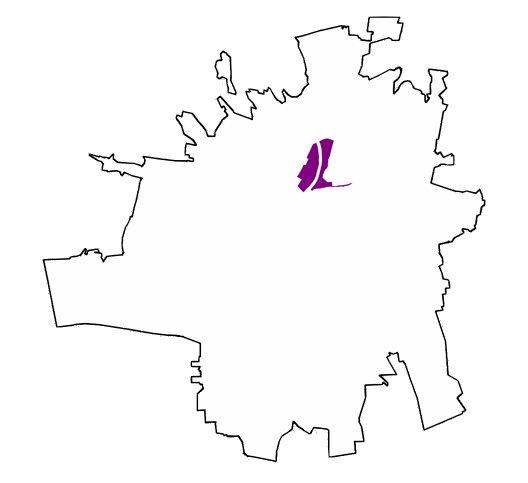
- Location of Tres Ríos Zone.
- Coordinates: 24°48′52″N 107°24′2″W
- Country: Mexico
- State: Sinaloa
- Municipality: Culiacán Municipality
- City: Culiacán
- Colonias of downtown: List: Tres Ríos
- ZIP codes: 80000 and 80020
- Website: culiacan.gob.mx

Desarrollo Urbano 3 Ríos is the sixth urban sector and the newest central business district in the central area of Culiacán, Sinaloa, Mexico. The zone is known for city's biggest mall Forum Mall (Mexico).

== Key points ==
=== Avenues and Streets ===
- Dr. Enrique Cabrera
- Enrique Félix Castro
- Blvd. Enrique Sánchez Alonso
- Teófilio Noris
- Rotarismo
- Diego Valadez Ríos (New Waterfront)
- Blvd. Alfonso Zaragoza Maytorena
- República de Brasil Street
- Lapislazuli Street
- Alejandro Avilés Inzunza
- Profr. Juan Macedo López
- Luis Donaldo Colosio
- Topacio Street
- Jade Street
- Agata Street
- Ópalo Street
- Esmeralda Street
- Diamante Street
- Perla Street
- Turquesa Street
- Zafiro Street
- Gema Street
- Agua Marina Street
- Diego Rivera Street
- Frida Khalo Street
- José Muro Pico
- David Alfaro Siqueiros
- Teresa Villegas
- Dr. Manuel Romero
- Hermilia Galindo de Topete
- Rosa Melano

=== Major Shopping Centers ===
- FORUM Culiacán
- Plaza Royal Culiacán
- Plaza Marizae
- Plaza Tres Ríos
- Plaza Mariana

=== Buildings ===
Major buildings in the Tres Ríos zone of Culiacán:

Currently tallest building in the zone and city
Under construction
Planned building

Rank	Name	Floors
1	World Trade Center Culiacán	26
2	Centro Bicentenario	22
3	Torre Tres Ríos	17
4	Edificio Dafi 2	16
5	Torre Santa María	11
6	Edificio Dafi	10
7	Torres del Río	9
8	Hotel Lucerna	8
9	Hotel One	8
10	Hotel Fiesta Inn	6
11	PGJ	6
12	HOMEX	5
13	Apartments #200	5
