= Centro Histórico =

Centro Histórico, Centro Historico (English:Historic centre) may refer to the historical centre of a city in a Portuguese or Spanish-speaking country. Examples include:

- Centro Histórico, Rio Grande do Sul, the central area of Porto Alegre, Brazil
- Historic center of Mexico City (Spanish: Centro Histórico de la Ciudad de México), the central area of Mexico City, Mexico
- Downtown Culiacán, the central area of Culiacán, Mexico
- Historic Centre of Macau (Portuguese: O Centro Histórico de Macau), the central area of Macau
