= Tamazula River =

Watercourse in Sinaloa, Mexico

Tamazula River Río Tamazula
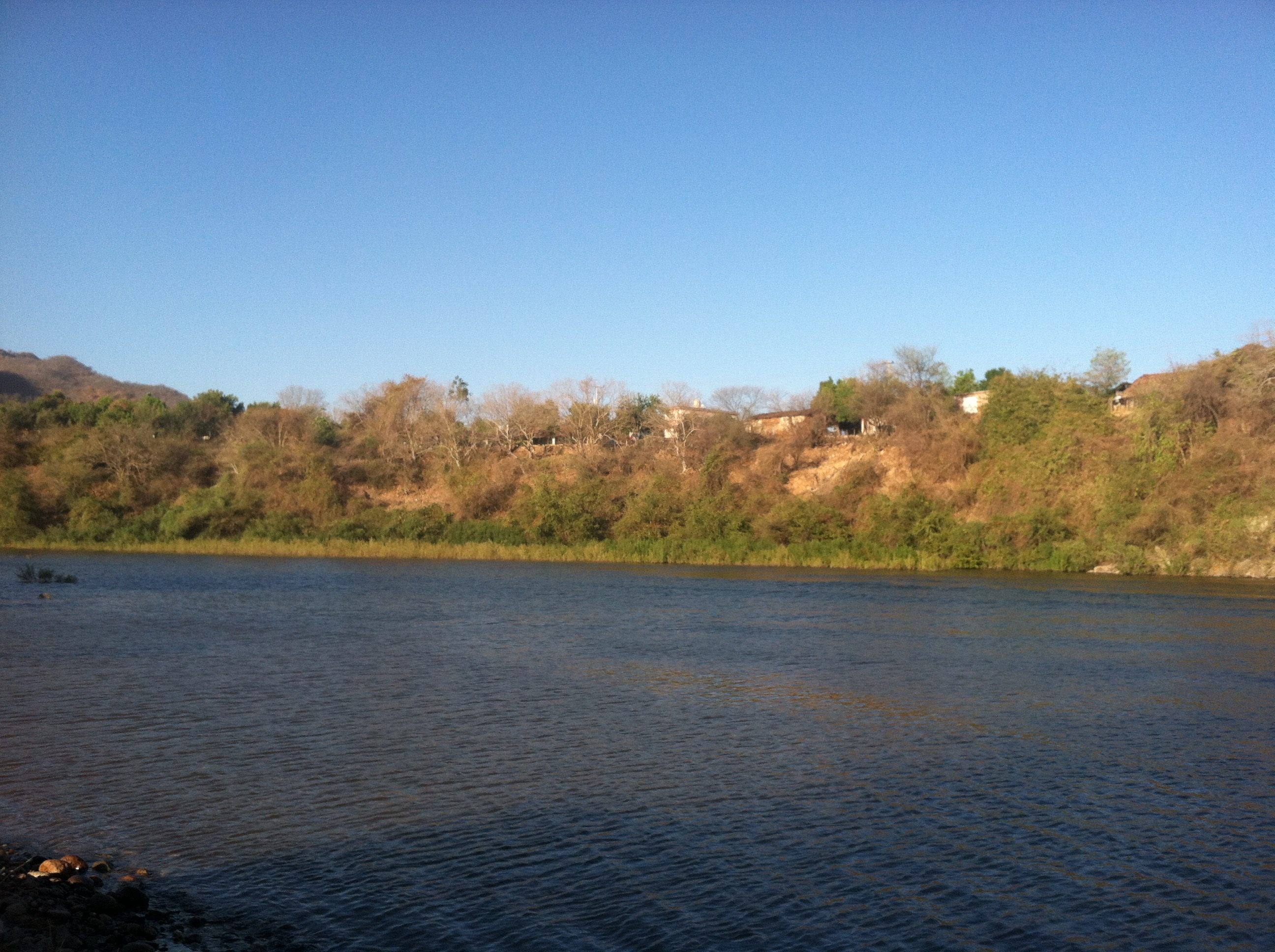
- River as it crosses from Durango to the state of Sinaloa.

Location
- Country: Mexico
- State: Durango; Sinaloa
- Municipality: Culiacán; Tamazula; Canelas

Physical characteristics
- Source
  - coordinates: 25.009969°N 106.586748°W

Basin features
- Cities: Culiacán Rosales

The Tamazula River is a river in the state of Sinaloa, Mexico, originating in the Sierra Madre Occidental mountains, flowing westward towards the Pacific Ocean. The Tamazula receives the Humaya River in the city of Culiacán to form the Culiacán River.

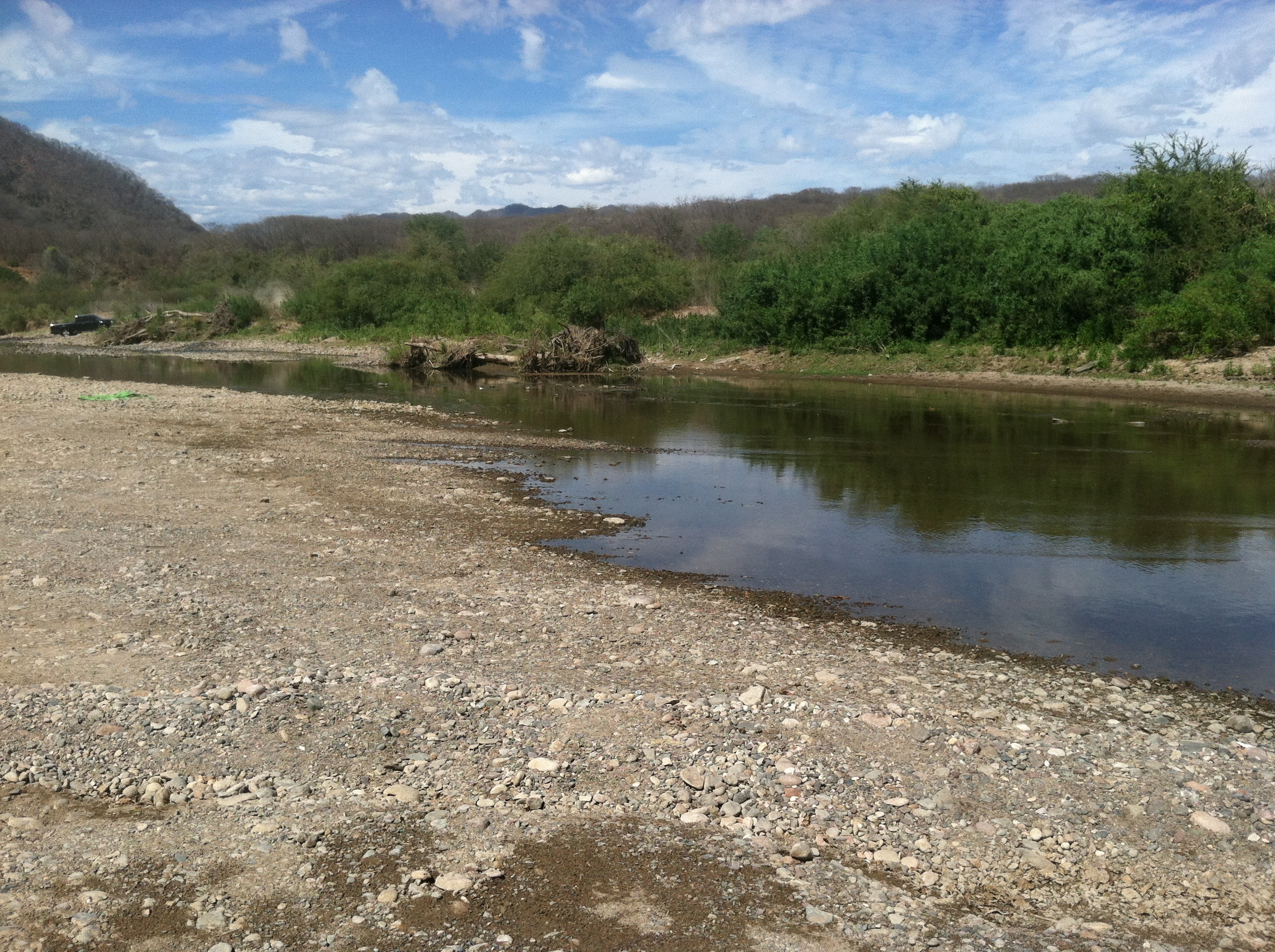
Tamazula River east of Tamazula, Durango. Its namesake town. During dry season.

The river is dammed at Sanalona, Sinaloa creating a large reservoir.
