= Downtown Culiacán =

Downtown Culiacán Centro, Centro Histórico, Primer Cuadro, Historical Center
- Sector 2 of Culiacán
- Culiacán Centro
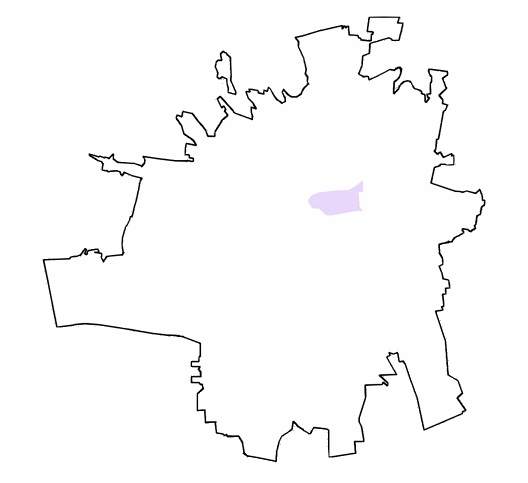
- Location of Downtown Culiacán.
- Coordinates: 24°48′17.5″N 107°23′07.8″W
- Country: Mexico
- State: Sinaloa
- Municipality: Culiacán Municipality
- City: Culiacán
- Foundation: 1531
- Founder: Nuño Beltrán de Guzmán
- Colonias of downtown: List: Culiacán Centro

Government
  - Mayor: Moisés Aarón Rivas Loaiza PRI
- ZIP codes: 80000
- Website: culiacan.gob.mx

Downtown Culiacán is the second urban sector and the central business district in the central area of Culiacán, Sinaloa, Mexico. The area features many of the city's operational offices, supermarkets, and necessary stores. It is the heart of Culiacán, the point where the city was born and, at present, the hub of transportation.

== Places of interest ==
=== Churches ===
==== Basílica de Nuestra Señora del Rosario ====
Basilica of Our Lady of the Rosary - The construction of the city's cathedral began on May 22, 1842, under the direction of Bishop Lázaro de la Garza y Ballesteros. Construction was completed in 1885, and on January 12, 1975, this church was elevated to the status of a basilica by Pope Paul VI.

==== Santuario del Sagrado Corazón de Jesús ====
Sanctuary of the Sacred Heart of Jesus - Located in downtown, at the junction of Ángel Flores Street and Donato Guerra Street, the Santuario del Sagrado Corazón de Jesús was built in 1908. The work was undertaken by the priest Jesús María Echavarría, with the design by Luis F. Molina.

=== Culture ===
==== Centro Cultural Genaro Estrada ====
It is a complex of buildings comprising theaters, an art school, galleries, and a cinema. Since its inception, the Centro Cultural Genaro Estrada has been an essential space for the development of Sinaloa's cultural life. Opened in 1980 to encourage artistic and cultural activity in the state, it has served as a forum for developing a wide range of cultural programs for all ages.

- Pablo de Villavicencio Theater
- Socorro Astol Theater
- Rosario Castellanos Agora
- José Limón Arts School
- Sala Lumiére
- Young Art Gallery
- Antonio López Sáenz Gallery
- Modern Art Gallery
- Torek Gallery
- Hallway Gallery

It is located on a city block, surrounded by Rafael Buelna Street, Ave. Ruperto Paliza, Ave. Jesus Andrade and Paseo Niños Heroes, adjacent to the Old Waterfront of the Tamazula River.

==== Casino de la Cultura ====
It opened on June 5, 1943, as Casino Culiacán, and it marked the beginning of the city's architectural and urban modernity. It is an example of the sobriety of engineering in its Art Deco architectural style. The building was, for nearly three decades, the most important social center in the region.

Since the 1970s, the building has been abandoned by its partners. However, despite serving as an undisputed meeting place for the local society for many years, the casino was seized in 1994 by a municipal expropriation decree, which preserved much of its original structure. Thus, as Casino de la Cultura, it again has a chance to be reused, this time as a cultural center.

It is located at the corner of two primary roads, Alvaro Obregon Avenue and Niños Heroes Street, at the foot of the Old Waterfront of the Tamazula River.

==== Regional Museum of Sinaloa ====
Founded as a museum of Culiacán and inaugurated on December 14, 1958, the Regional Museum of Sinaloa is the city's oldest. For half a century, the Regional Museum of Sinaloa has been a space linked with the past, strengthening the regional identity.

The building is located within the Constitution Civic Center complex, which integrates libraries, sports areas, and a zoo. Its style is inscribed within the mainstream of architectural functionalism, with the simplicity and effectiveness of that era.

==== Museo de Arte de Sinaloa ====
The Sinaloa Art Museum (MASIN) is one of the most important venues for the exhibition of hundreds of visual arts assemblies in Culiacán: exhibitions of painting, sculpture, photography, drawing, graphics, installation, video and art-object; and is a key forum for performing arts, cultural and academic events, such as concerts, book presentations, conferences, symposia and workshops of various artistic disciplines.

The building that houses it was built in 1837, and in 1890, it was remodelled by architect Luis F. Molina into the Municipal Palace. From 1980, it was used as the headquarters of the municipal police. In 1990, it was renovated to accommodate the museum and opened as such on November 21, 1991.

=== Parks ===
==== Parque Revolución ====
The park is located in the city center, and it is home to the local basketball team, Caballeros de Culiacán. The park area is currently being remodeled, including the basketball arena.

==== Centro Cívico Constitución ====
Established in December 1958, the zoo is a prominent landmark in the city. Despite ongoing economic challenges, it remains a major recreational center in the capital.

== Infrastructure ==
=== Buildings ===
Currently tallest building in the zone

Rank	Name	Floors
1	Hotel Ramada	12
2	Edificio #13 Pte.	10
3	Hotel San Marcos	7
4	Condominios Villa del Real	7
5	Hotel Salvador	7
6	Hotel Santa Fe	7
7	Banorte	6
8	Conjunto El Dorado	6
9	Hotel Ejecutivo	6
10	Edificio Omega	6
11	Juárez #4778	6
12	Hotel San Francisco	6
13	Hotel Palma	6

=== Schools ===
- Autonomous University of Sinaloa High School (Central Campus)
- Casa Blanca University
- COBAES 26 (Gral. Ángel Flores)
- COBAES 27 (Culiacán)
