= Forum Mall =

Forum Mall may refer to:

- Forum, a brand of shopping malls in Mexico, including:
  - Forum Buenavista, in Buenavista, Cuauhtémoc, Mexico City
  - Forum Culiacán, in Culiacán, Sinaloa
- Forum Mall Kochi, a shopping mall in Kochi, India
- Forum Courtyard, a shopping mall in Kolkata, India
- Forum South Bengaluru, a shopping mall in Bengaluru, India
- Forum Lviv, Ukraine
