= Culiacán Cathedral =

Coordinates: 24.8087°N 107.3939°W

Cathedral Basilica of Our Lady of the Rosary
- Catedral Basílica de Nuestra Señora del Rosario
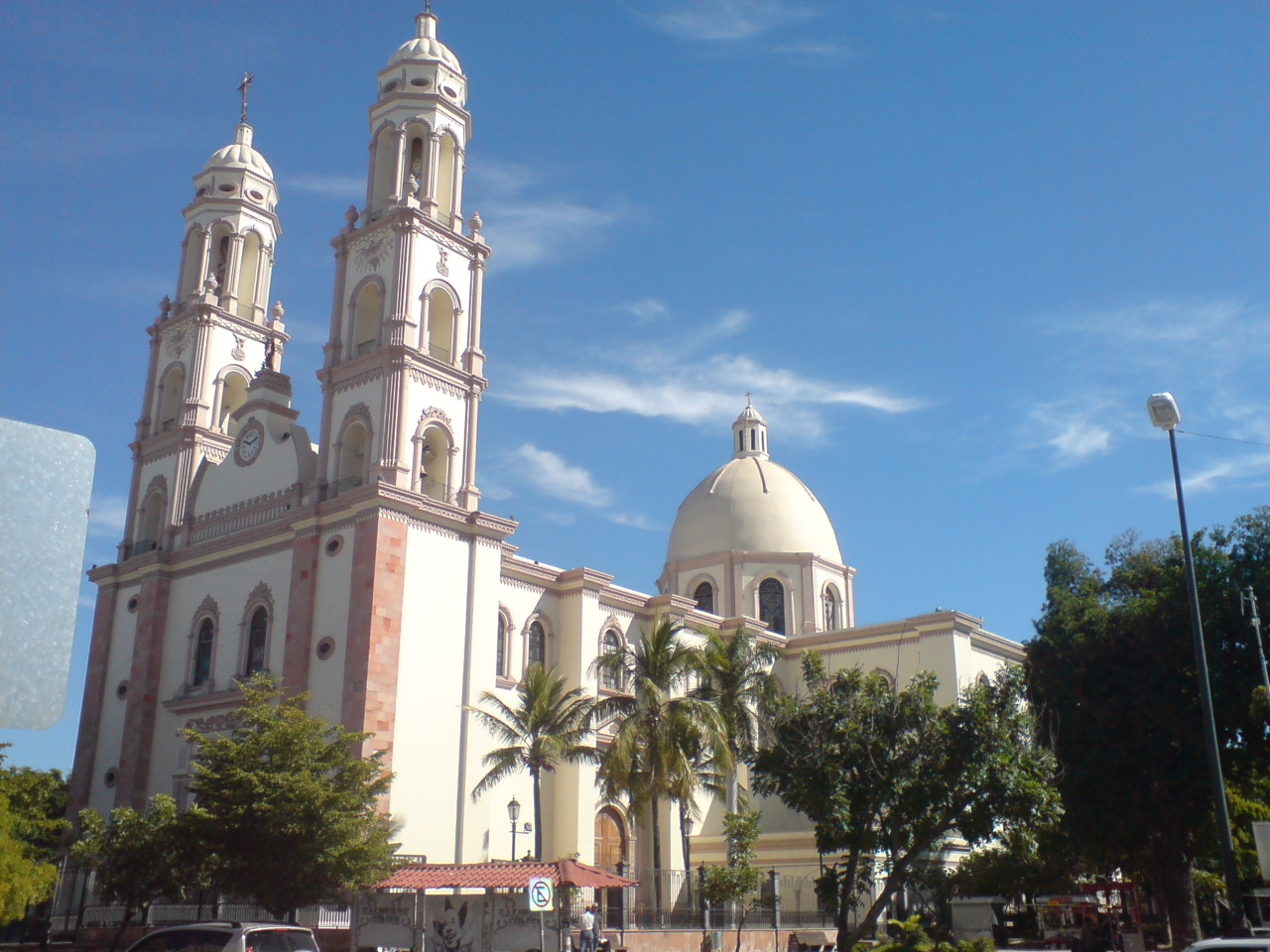
- Cathedral Basilica of Our Lady of the Rosary
- Location: Culiacán
- Country: Mexico
- Denomination: Roman Catholic Church

Administration
- Diocese: Roman Catholic Diocese of Culiacán

Clergy
- Bishop: Jesús José Herrera Quiñonez

The Cathedral Basilica of Our Lady of the Rosary (Spanish: Catedral Basílica de Nuestra Señora del Rosario), also known as Culiacán Cathedral, is the Catholic cathedral that serves as the headquarters of the diocese of Culiacán, Mexico.

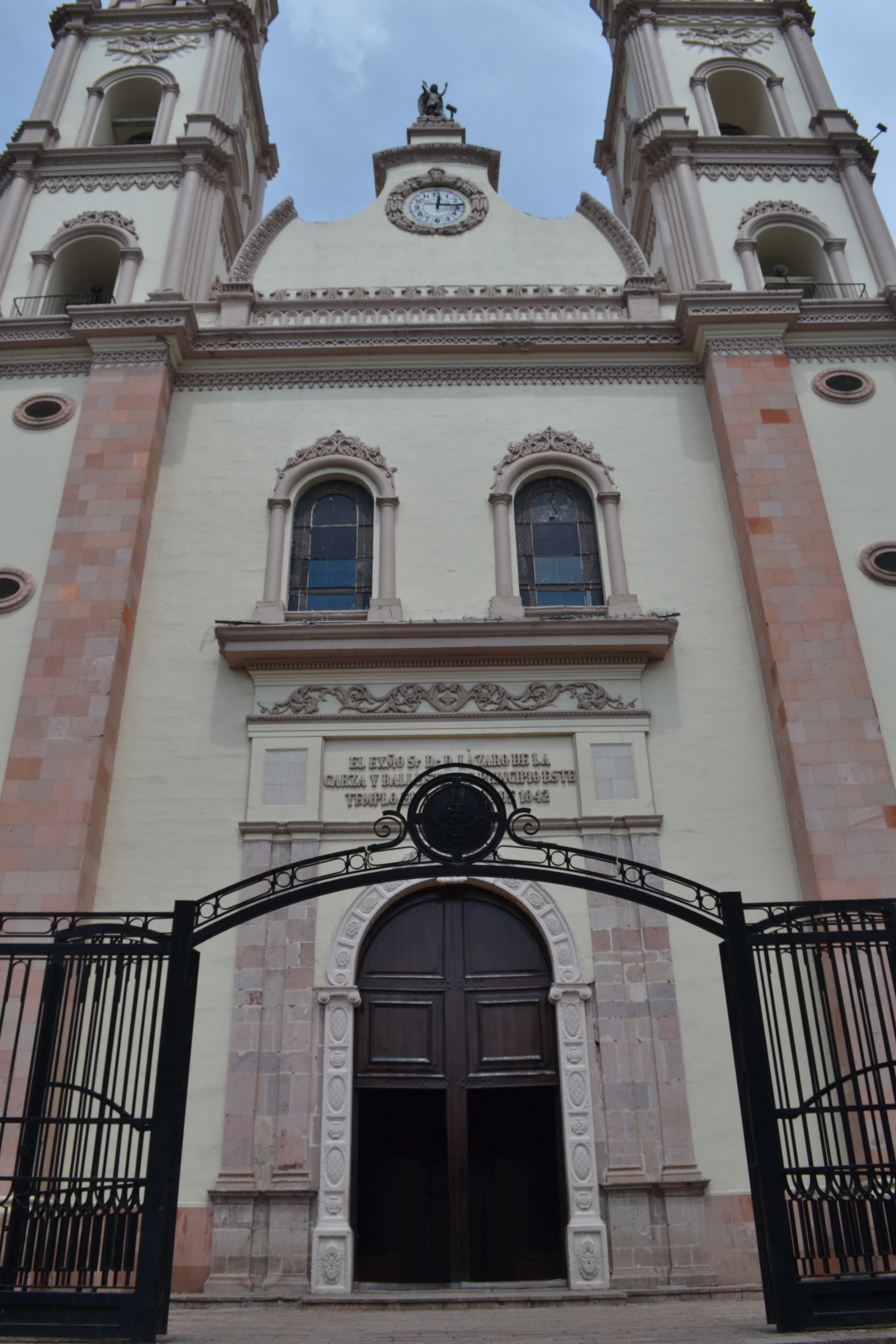
Entrance

On May 22, 1842, the seventh bishop of Sonora and Sinaloa, Lázaro de la Garza y Ballesteros, authorized construction of the church. After an interruption in the works, these were restarted in 1855 by the Honorable. S. D. D. Pedro Loza y Pardavé. And then the building was interrupted again because of the Reform Movement. Its construction is finally completed in 1885 by the Exmo. Mr. Dn. José de Jesús Uriarte.

Its architectural language is highlighted by predominantly neoclassical elements, with certain eclectic elements from the 19th century.

== See also ==
- Roman Catholicism in Mexico
- Cathedral Basilica of Our Lady of the Rosary, Manizales, Colombia
- Cathedral Basilica of Our Lady of the Rosary, Rosario, Argentina
