= Culiacán River =

River in Mexico

Culiacán River Rio Culiacán
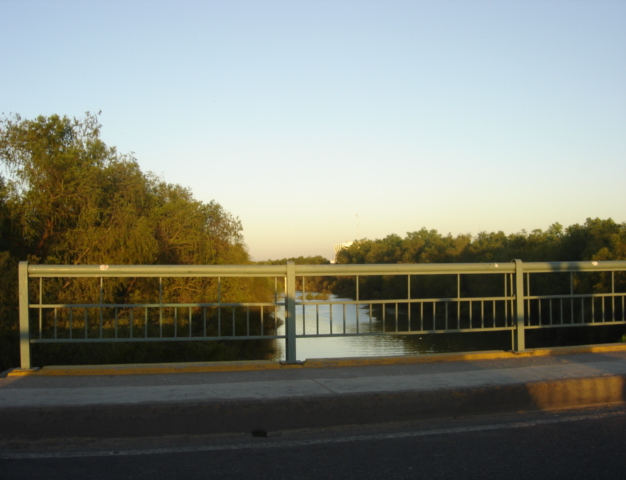
- Culiacán River

- Location of mouth

Location
- Country: Mexico
- State: Sinaloa

Physical characteristics
- Source
  - location: Culiacán
- Mouth
  - location: Gulf of California, Pacific Ocean
  - coordinates: 24°29′32″N 107°43′55″W
  - elevation: Sea level

The Culiacán River is a river that is formed at the confluence of the Tamazula River and Humaya River, located in Culiacán city of Sinaloa state, in northwestern Mexico.

The river flows from the Sierra Madre Occidental headwaters confluence generally westwards and down into the Gulf of California of the Pacific Ocean.

== See also ==
- Mexican golden trout — endemic to the headwaters area of this and several other rivers in the Sierra Madre Occidental.
- List of longest rivers of Mexico
