= Forum Culiacán =

Shopping mall in Sinaloa, Mexico

FORUM Culiacán
- Location: Culiacán, Sinaloa, Mexico
- Coordinates: 24.8141°N 107.400960°W
- Address: Blvd. José Diego Valdez Ríos (Malecón Nuevo) #1676, Desarrollo Urbano Tres Ríos, 80000
- Opened: Winter 2003
- Manager: GICSA
- Num. of stores: 5 department stores 74 shops 23 restaurants 1 cinema 1 arcade zone 1 casino 2 hotels
- Num. of anchor tenants: 4 (Liverpool, Sears, Sanborns and Coppel)
- Floor area: 56,547 m^{2} (608,670 sq ft) (building area)
- Floors: Main & entertainment buildings: 2 Carpark buildings: 3
- Website: forumculiacan.com.mx

The Forum Culiacán is a shopping mall located in Culiacán, Sinaloa, Mexico, in Desarrollo Urbano 3 Ríos (3 Rivers Urban Development), one of the biggest districts in the city, next to Culiacan river. The two-story complex includes many clothing stores, a pet shop, a food court, and a cinema. It has many shops including New Era.

The mall features the Santa María Tower and Tres Ríos Tower, a Ley Plaza supermarket, the Lucerna Hotel, the Riveras park, the Win Casino, and more around the mall.

== Fire ==
A fire that began in a restaurant's fryer was extinguished by firefighters on September 3, 2017.

== Crime ==
A scene involving motorcyclists took place outside the mall on 6 May 2017. The Restaurante Mar & Sea, an up-market seafood restaurant formerly known as El Farallón, is owned by former state governor Juan S. Millán. In June 2017, at least eight people at the restaurant were kidnapped by armed men.
