= Humaya River =

River in the state of Sinaloa, Mexico

The Humaya River is a river in the state of Sinaloa, Mexico, that connects to the Tamazula River in the city of Culiacán to form the Culiacán River. The source of the river is the Sierra Madre Occidental mountains. The water flows from the north of the city.

The water then flows to the Pacific Ocean.
