= El Álamo, Culiacán =

El Álamo
- Location within Sinaloa Location within Mexico
- Coordinates: 24°31′37″N 107°7′15″W
- Country: Mexico
- State: Sinaloa
- Municipality: Culiacán
- Elevation: 111 m (364 ft)

Population (2014)
  - Total: 229
- Time zone: UTC-7 (Zona Pacífico)

El Álamo is a rancho (hamlet) in the municipality of Culiacán in the Mexican state of Sinaloa. According to estimates from 2014, 229 inhabitants lived in the settlement.
