= Mexico International University =

- Universidad Mexico Internacional
- Motto in English: Cradle of Leaders
- Type: Private
- Established: 2004
- Location: Culiacán, Sinaloa, Mexico; 24.8173°N 107.3811°W
- Website: http://umi.edu.mx/index.php

The Universidad México Internacional (UMI) is a private university located in Culiacán, Sinaloa, Mexico. It is focused on business and communication degrees. The university has specifically worked with companies like Grupo Michelín, Coca-Cola, Grupo Dispamocusa, and Grupo de Banqueros del Noroeste to create certification and training processes to best serve students.

== Academics ==
UMI offers bachelor's degrees in:

- Arts
- Communication Sciences
- Global Commerce
- Business Management
- Industrial Engineering and Administration
- Marketing and Advertising

Along with a master's in business management. The university's programs have received state-level Reconocimiento de Validez Oficial de Estudios (RVOE), including its master's program in business management and bachelor's programs in fields such as global commerce, business management, communication sciences, marketing and advertising, arts, and industrial engineering and administration.

Specialized Certificates in:

- Oral Communication
- Art and Integral Design
- Oral Communication and Business Presentations
- 3D Digital Design and Postproduction

And a specialized seminar in oral communication (Children).
