= Universidad Casa Blanca =

Coordinates: 24.8107°N 107.3937°W

- Motto: Casa abierta al pensamiento creativo (Spanish for: open house to the creative thinking)
- Type: Private
- Established: 1990
- President: Diana Lucia Sato Martinez
- Academic staff: 375
- Postgraduates: 20
- Location: Culiacán, Sinaloa, Mexico
- Campus: Urban
- Mascot: White Tigers
- Website: ucb.mx

The Universidad Casa Blanca (commonly known as UCB, English: "Casa Blanca University") is a private arts and design university located in Culiacán, Sinaloa, Mexico. It is one of the state's preeminent institutions of higher learning and one of the best design,(graphic design, architecture, interior design, fashion design, industrial design) and marketing schools in Sinaloa, Mexico.
