= Culiacancito =

Town in Sinaloa, Mexico

- Town
- Location within Mexico
- Coordinates: 24°49′30″N 107°32′00″W
- Country: Mexico
- State: Sinaloa
- Municipality: Culiacán

Population (2020)
  - Total: 11,980
- Time zone: UTC-7 (MST)
  - Summer (DST): UTC-6 (MDT)

Culiacancito is a small town located northwest of the larger city of Culiacán, Sinaloa, Mexico. The towns' economy and wealth is based on agriculture and livestock farming, as all 100% of the land in the district is irrigated.

Culiacancito comes from a dimunative form of the neighboring city Culiacán, which itself comes from the Nahuatl root word colhuatzinco. The suffix -cito makes the towns' name be interpreted as the "smaller city" of Culiacán. Former professional footballer and ESPN commentator Jared Borgetti was born in Culiacancito.
