= Aguaruto =

Town in the Mexican state of Sinaloa

Coordinates: 24°46′N 107°33′W

Aguaruto (Spanish pronunciation: [aɣwaˈɾuto]) is a small town just west of the larger city of Culiacán, Sinaloa, Mexico.

The name "Aguaruto" means place of plants with horns.

== Notable people ==
- Carlos Manuel Castaños Crary, Chairman of Fruteria y Merceria Castaños, CEO of Crary Fresh and CEO/President of Perfumes Emiratos
