= Culiacán =

City in Sinaloa, Mexico

- City
- Culiacán Rosales
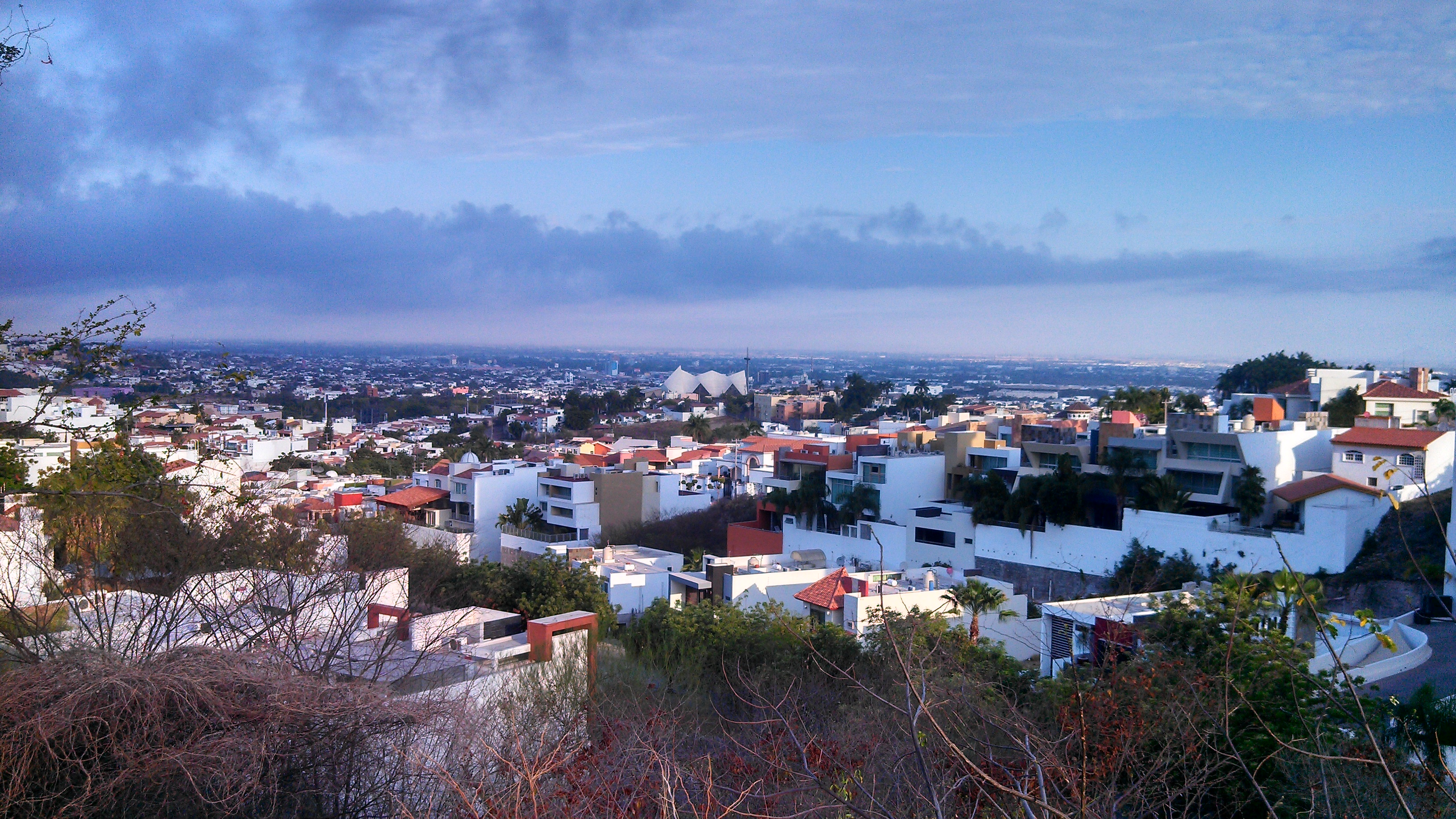
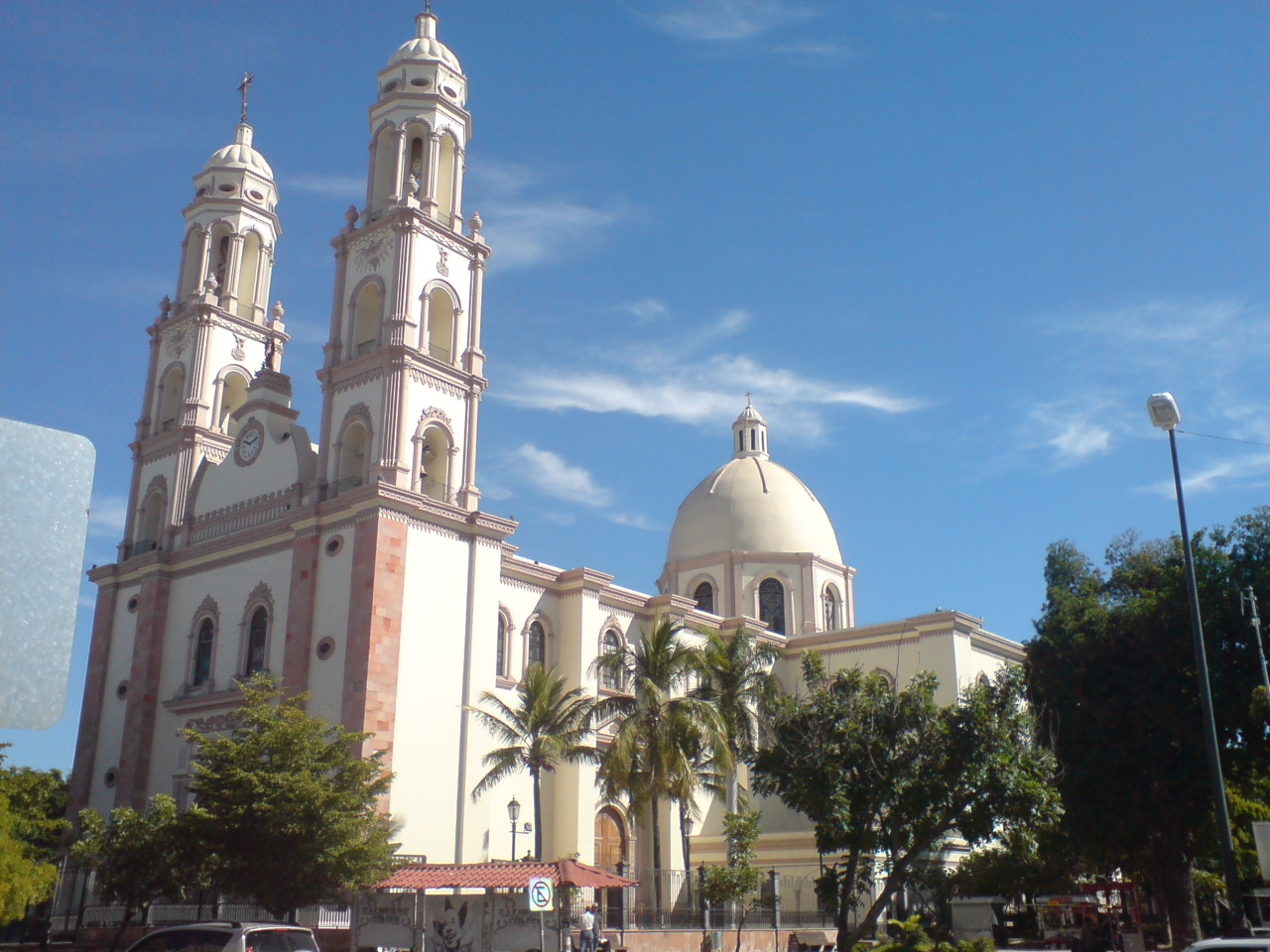
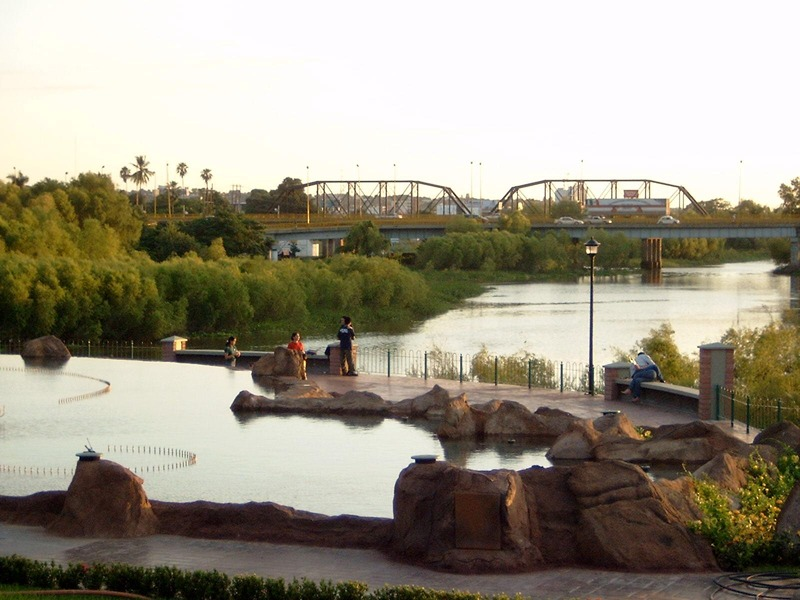
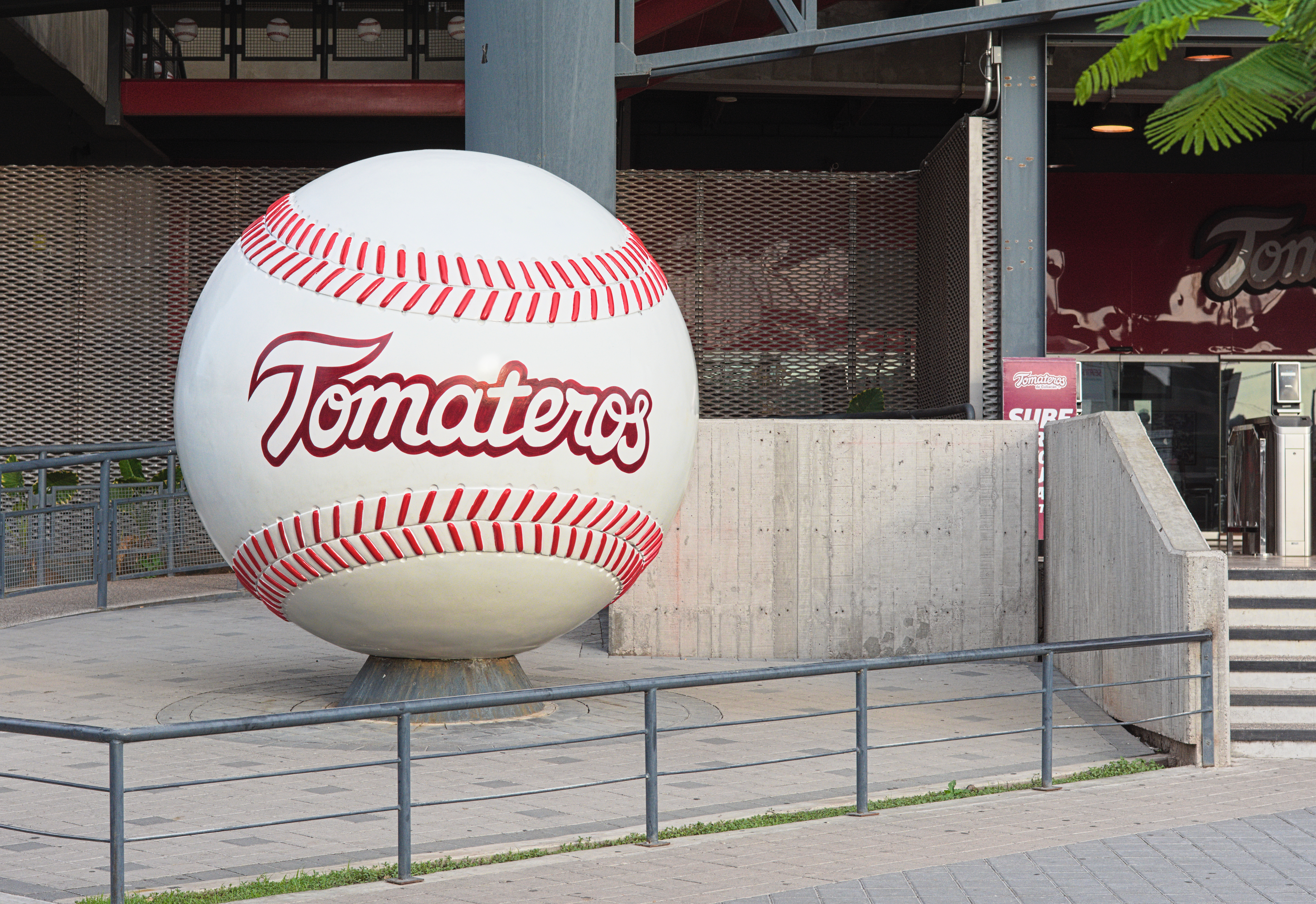
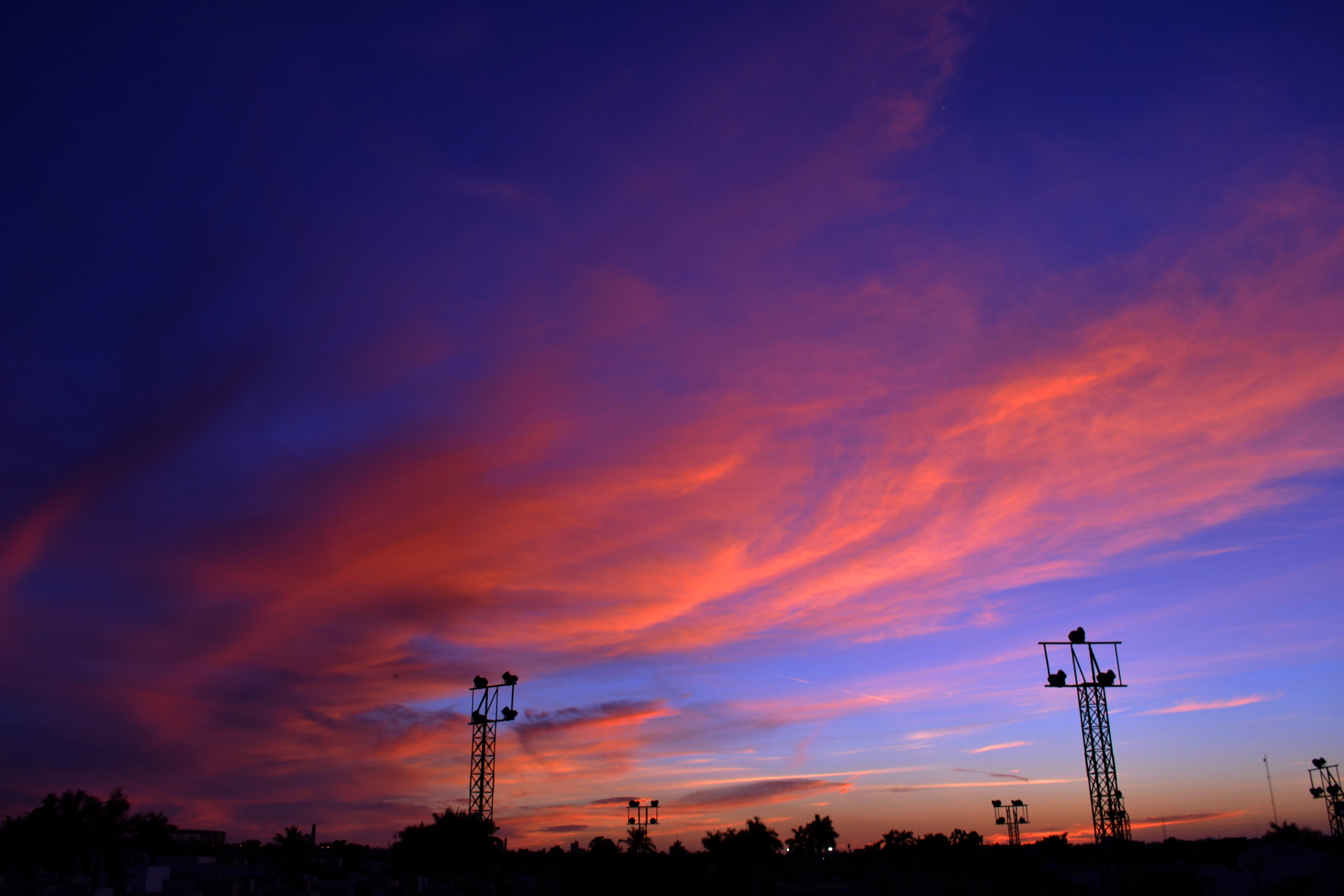
- Left to right: Panoramic view of the city · Culiacán Botanical Garden · Culiacán Cathedral · Tres Ríos District · Monumental letters · Tomateros de Culiacán baseball monument · Sunset in Culiacán

- Coat of arms
- Nickname: La Perla del Humaya (The Pearl of the Humaya)
- Location in Sinaloa Location in Mexico
- Coordinates: 24°48′25″N 107°23′38″W
- Country: Mexico
- State: Sinaloa
- Municipality: Culiacán
- Foundation: 1531

Area
  - City: 65 km^{2} (25 sq mi)
- Elevation: 71 m (233 ft)

Population (2020)
  - City: 808,416
  - Estimate (2026): 900,192
  - Rank: 21st in Mexico
  - Density: 12,000/km^{2} (32,000/sq mi)
  - Urban: 912,028
  - Metro: 1,003,530
  - Religions: Roman Catholic Church
- Demonym(s): culiacanense, "culichi"

GDP (PPP, constant 2015 values)
  - Year: 2023
  - Total (metro area): $17.8 billion
  - Per capita: $20,000
- Time zone: UTC−07:00 (Zona Pacífico)
- Area code: +52 667
- Waterways: Tamazula River, Humaya River, Culiacán River
- Airports: Federal de Bachigualato International Airport
- Public transit: RedPlus
- Railroads: Ferromex Culiacán Station
- Website: www.culiacan.gob.mx

Culiacán, officially Culiacán Rosales, is the capital and largest city of Sinaloa in northwestern Mexico. Located within the Culiacán Municipality, the city was founded on 29 September 1531, by the Spanish conquistadors Lázaro de Cebreros and Nuño Beltrán de Guzmán. It was originally named "Villa de San Miguel", in honor of its patron saint Michael the Archangel.

As of the 2020 census, Culiacán had an estimated population of 808,416, making it the 21st most populous city in Mexico. Its metropolitan area, with a population of 1,003,530, was the 17th most populous metropolitan area in Mexico.

The city sits in a valley on the slopes of the Sierra Madre Occidental, at the confluence of the Tamazula and Humaya Rivers, where both join to form the Culiacán River. 55 meters above sea level.

== Etymology ==
The name derives from the Nahuatl colhua ("ancestor" or a tribal name) and the locative –cán ("place"), rendering "place of the Colhua". Some historians alternatively interpret it as "snake place" or "crooked hill". The most accepted theory is "place of the colhuas", or "inhabited by the colhua tribe", and the most frequent meaning is "place of worshiping the god Coltzin".

== History ==
=== Prehispanic era ===
An ancient indigenous settlement called Huey Colhuacan dates back to Tecpatl, which corresponds to 628 CE. The Aztecs built it during their pilgrimage. Its exact location is unknown, but it is generally assumed that it was close to the current town of Culiacáncito.

=== Founding ===
The city known today as Culiacán was co-founded in 1531 by conquistadors Lázaro de Cebreros and Nuño Beltrán de Guzmán under the name "Villa de San Miguel". Upon their arrival in the 16th century, the Spanish found that farmhouses were organized into indigenous nations by the tribe of the Tahues, which brought together people of the same origin and language with a common tradition.

Other indigenous peoples that inhabited the original territory of Culiacán were the Tebacas, Pacaxes, Sabaibo, and Achires.

After their conquest in 1531, de Cebreros and de Guzmán organized the acquired territories into three provinces. One of them was Culiacán, which was delimited to the South by the Elota River and to the North by the Mocorito River, depending on the Kingdom of Nueva Galicia. Organized in this way, the territory lasted until 1786, the year in which the administration system was implemented, with Sonora and Sinaloa forming the province of Arizpe and the older province of Culiacán remaining the same.

=== Independent Mexico ===
On 6 October 1821, independence was proclaimed at Culiacán. It was granted city status on 21 July 1823, when the provinces of Sonora and Sinaloa were separated by decree from Congress. In 1824, under the Constitutive Act of the Mexican Federation, Sinaloa and Sonora reunited to form the Estado de Occidente. On 13 October 1830, the provinces of Sonora and Sinaloa were definitively separated by decree, with the city of Culiacán designated the capital of the state of Sinaloa. In 1861, during the conservative government of the French Intervention, prefectures were established, and the Municipalities Law was enacted, dividing the Districts into City Councils. The Badiraguato District was suppressed and became a municipality within the Culiacán District.

From 1859 to 1873, the capital of Sinaloa was moved from Culiacán to Mazatlán. In the Restored Republic, Governor Eustaquio Buelna confronted the merchants of the port. He returned to Culiacán, and the Local Congress granted it the status of the state capital.

=== Porfirian and revolutionary times ===
In 1878, Culiacán had three City Halls, whose headwaters were Culiacán, Quilá, and Badiraguato. This remained the case until 1880, when Badiraguato reverted to being a district with the limits that had previously applied to it.

Municipalities were established by law in 1912 as a new form of internal government. However, this law did not come into force until 1915, when political directors were abolished, thereby freeing the districts. Culiacán was established as a municipality by decree on 8 April 1915. Within its original limits was the current Municipality of Navolato, which was segregated from Culiacán on 27 August 1982, depriving the city of 2,285 square kilometres (882 mi^{2}) of valley agriculture.

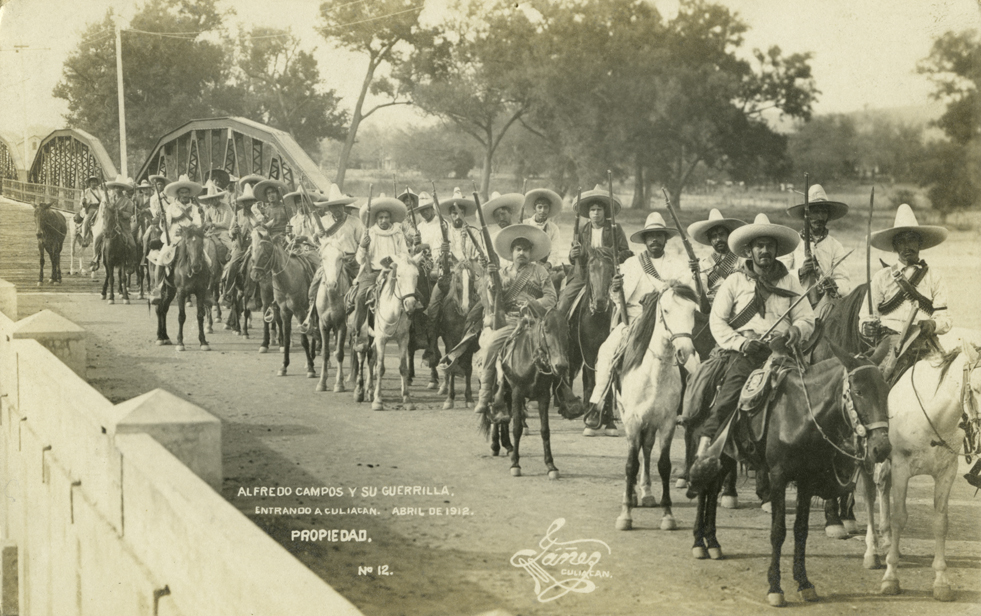
Alfredo Campos and his guerrilla, entering Culiacán, in April 1912.

Sometime later, the State Congress approved the extension of the capital city's name, giving it its current official name of Culiacán de Rosales. "Rosales" honors the Mexican military general Antonio Rosales, who fought in the second French Intervention and the Reform War, along with serving as the governor of Sinaloa.

=== World War II and opium cultivation for morphine ===
During World War II, the United States experienced shortages of medical morphine after opium supplies from Asia were disrupted by the Pacific War. In response, Mexican authorities, in cooperation with U.S. officials, expanded regulated opium poppy cultivation in northwestern Mexico, including rural areas surrounding Culiacán in the state of Sinaloa. Farmers in the mountainous regions of Sierra Madre Occidental, near the city, produced opium that was processed into legal morphine for wartime medical use by Allied forces. Although the program ended after 1945, the agricultural knowledge, smuggling routes, and local intermediary networks developed during the wartime period persisted. Historians and criminologists have identified these postwar networks as an early foundation for later illicit drug trafficking organizations in Sinaloa.

=== After World War II ===
Mexican cartel headquarters

From the late 1950s onward, Culiacán emerged as a major hub for drug trafficking to the United States. The completion of the Pan-American Highway and the regional airport in the 1960s accelerated the expansion of workable distribution infrastructure for the few enterprising families that would later come to dominate the international drug cartels along Mexico's Pacific Northwest. The Sinaloa Cartel made Culiacán its primary base.

On 17 October 2019, after an ultimately unsuccessful attempt to arrest one of the Sinaloa Cartel's leaders, widespread gunfights broke out across the city, leading to multiple deaths, in what has been called the "Battle of Culiacán". One of Joaquín "El Chapo" Guzmán's relatives, Ovidio Guzmán, was arrested, but the police were eventually forced to release him.

== Coat of arms ==
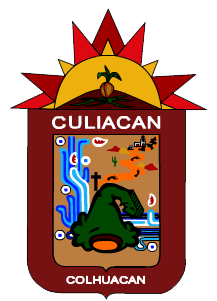
Coat of arms of the city of Culiacán.

The coat of arms for both the municipality and the city of Culiacán has various elements that represent their history.

Rolando Arjona Amábilis designed the coat of arms, and on 26 May 1960, municipal decree number 13 made his design Culiacán's official coat of arms. It was published in number 90 of the Official Newspaper of the State of Sinaloa on 30 July 1960. Its shape is square with rounded corners ending in a point. The entire face of the shield is covered with a carmine color. A hieroglyph sits in the middle representing a hill with a human head bowing forward. The glyph alludes to Coltzin, "the crooked god," a figure of Nahua mythology, who gave his name to the Nahuatlaca-Colhua tribe and to the town they lived in, Colhuacán or Teocolhuacán.

Across the front of the shield, blue lines represent rivers. A black cross sits in the middle-left, next to a path with footprints leading to a small structure in the top-right. These motifs symbolize the missionaries who ventured north from San Miguel de Culiacán and pay homage to their benevolence and heroism.

The border bears the Spanish name "Culiacán" at the top and the Nahuatl name "Colhuacán" at the bottom. At the top of the shield is a hill with a germinating seed and a golden sun, alluding to the region's tropical climate and agricultural industry.

== Politics ==
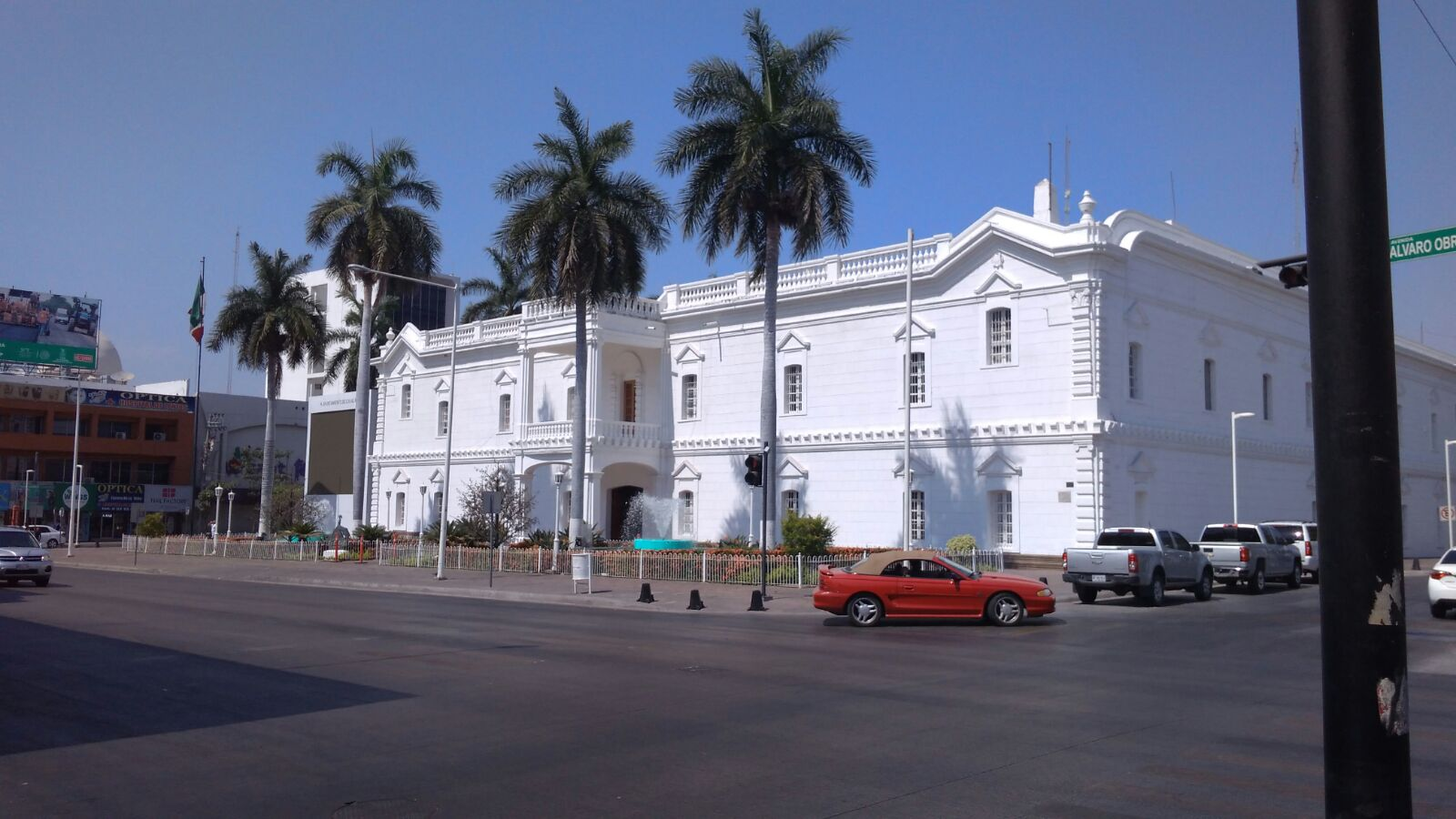
Culiacán City hall.

The government of the municipality of Culiacán is represented by its City Council, which is elected by universal, direct, and secret vote for a term of three years. The term is not renewable for the immediate period, but can be continuous. The elected officials begin exercising their positions on 1 January of the year following the election. The City Council is composed of the Municipal President, a Procurator Trustee, and a body of councilors consisting of 18 representatives elected by relative majority and seven by the principle of proportional representation.

=== Syndications ===
For its internal regime, the municipality is subdivided into 17 receiverships, which in turn are divided into police stations. The 17 receiverships of the municipality are: El Salado, Higueras de Abuya, Baila, Aguaruto, Emiliano Zapata, Adolfo López Mateos (El Tamarindo), Jesús María, Las Tapias, Quilá, Sanalona, San Lorenzo, Tacuichamona, Tepuche, Imala, Costa Rica, Culiacáncito, and Eldorado.

=== Paramunicipals ===
- Culiacán Zoo
- JAPAC
- Municipal Institute of Sports and Physical Culture (IMDEC)
- EME Park (87)
- Municipal Institute of Culiacán Women (IMMUJERES)
- MIA Institute (MIA Museum & MIA Auditorium)
- Culiacán Municipal Institute of Culture (IMCC)
- Housing Institute
- DIF Culiacán
- The Chronicle of Culiacán
- Municipal Institute of Youth (IMJU)
- Municipal Commission of Populated Centers of Culiacán (COMUN)
- IMPLAN
- COMPAVI

== Geography ==

=== Location ===
Culiacán is located in the central region of the State of Sinaloa, in northwestern Mexico. The coordinates that correspond to it are 24°48'15" N (latitude) by 107°25'52" W (West), with an altitude of 54 meters above sea level.

The city is located 1,240 kilometres (770 mi) from Mexico City. From Culiacán to Tepic is 502 km; to Durango, 536 km; to Hermosillo, 688 km; to Guadalajara, 708 km; to Monterrey, 1,118 km; to Chihuahua, 1,159 km; to Tijuana, 1,552 km; and to Matamoros, 1,434 km.

=== Relief and hydrography ===
The mountainous part and the coastal plain clearly define the municipality's relief. The mountainous part corresponds to the physiographic region of the highlands, part of the Pacific slope of the Sierra Madre Occidental mountain range with elevations of 300 to 2,100 meters above sea level. The coastal plain lies to the West and is crossed by four regional rivers: the Humaya, Tamazula, Culiacán and San Lorenzo. The Humaya originates in the State of Durango, entering Sinaloa through Badiraguato; the Licenciado Adolfo López Mateos dam regulates its waters. The Tamazula River originates in the Sierra Madre Occidental near the Topia Valley; the Sanalona Dam regulates its waters. The Humaya and Tamazula Rivers unite in front of the city of Culiacán to form the Culiacán River, which empties into the Gulf of California. The San Lorenzo is born from the Sierra Madre Occidental within the State of Durango, enters Sinaloa through Cosalá, and empties into the Gulf of California.

=== Climate ===
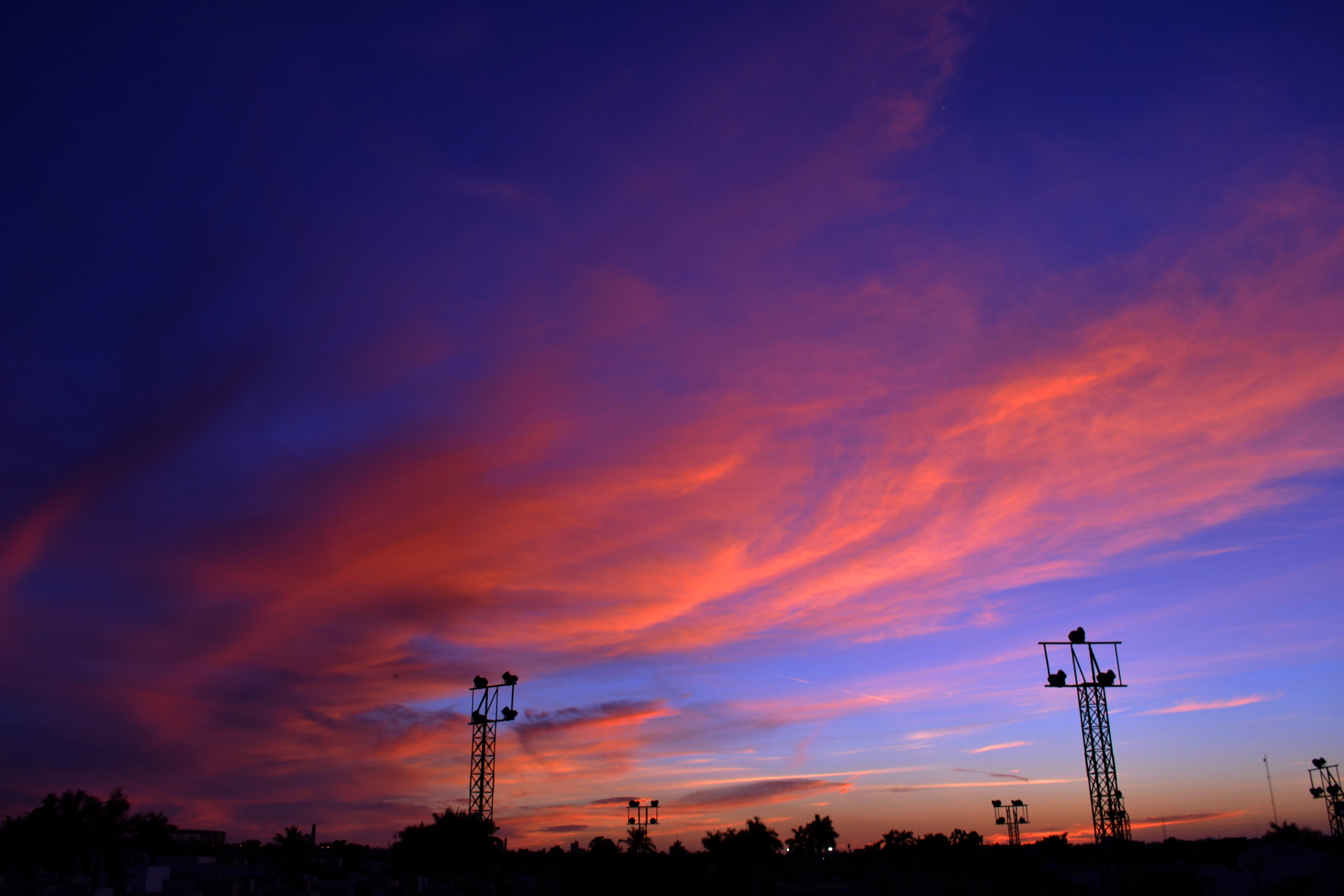
Sunset in Culiacán.

Culiacán has a hot semi-arid climate (Köppen: BSh), despite receiving an annual rainfall over 600 mm (24 in), due to its hot temperatures and high evaporation. Summers are very hot and humid, shade temperatures can reach 45 °C (113 °F) and high humidity can produce heat indices of 50 to 55 °C (122 to 131 °F), with the risk of heavy rainfall from decaying tropical cyclones also present. Winters are much milder, with lower humidity, an average high of 27 °C, and warm nights.

Climate data for Culiacán (1991–2020)
Month	Jan	Feb	Mar	Apr	May	Jun	Jul	Aug	Sep	Oct	Nov	Dec	Year
Record high °C (°F)	41.0 (105.8)	42.0 (107.6)	39.0 (102.2)	41.5 (106.7)	43.0 (109.4)	45.5 (113.9)	43.5 (110.3)	46.0 (114.8)	42.5 (108.5)	44.2 (111.6)	42.5 (108.5)	37.0 (98.6)	46.0 (114.8)
Mean daily maximum °C (°F)	28.5 (83.3)	29.4 (84.9)	31.4 (88.5)	33.8 (92.8)	36.1 (97.0)	37.3 (99.1)	36.8 (98.2)	36.1 (97.0)	35.4 (95.7)	35.8 (96.4)	32.5 (90.5)	28.6 (83.5)	33.5 (92.3)
Daily mean °C (°F)	20.4 (68.7)	21.0 (69.8)	22.6 (72.7)	24.9 (76.8)	27.9 (82.2)	30.9 (87.6)	30.8 (87.4)	30.2 (86.4)	29.8 (85.6)	28.9 (84.0)	24.8 (76.6)	20.8 (69.4)	26.1 (79.0)
Mean daily minimum °C (°F)	12.2 (54.0)	12.6 (54.7)	13.7 (56.7)	16.0 (60.8)	19.6 (67.3)	24.4 (75.9)	24.7 (76.5)	24.3 (75.7)	24.2 (75.6)	22.1 (71.8)	17.1 (62.8)	13.1 (55.6)	18.7 (65.7)
Record low °C (°F)	2.0 (35.6)	2.0 (35.6)	3.0 (37.4)	3.0 (37.4)	9.0 (48.2)	12.0 (53.6)	13.0 (55.4)	16.0 (60.8)	17.0 (62.6)	11.0 (51.8)	5.0 (41.0)	3.0 (37.4)	2.0 (35.6)
Average precipitation mm (inches)	13.8 (0.54)	14.4 (0.57)	2.7 (0.11)	1.3 (0.05)	1.1 (0.04)	18.0 (0.71)	151.3 (5.96)	216.1 (8.51)	187.5 (7.38)	42.8 (1.69)	22.3 (0.88)	15.9 (0.63)	687.2 (27.06)
Average precipitation days (≥ 0.1 mm)	2.4	2.5	1	0.5	0.6	3.5	15.7	17.2	13.1	3.4	2.5	2.4	64.8
Average relative humidity (%)	72	70	67	65	64	67	72	75	75	72	71	72	70
Mean monthly sunshine hours	196.4	201.6	236.2	225.7	262.1	229.4	198.8	199.2	200.2	231.9	224.6	193.9	2,600
Mean daily sunshine hours	6.1	6.6	7.4	7.1	8.0	7.4	6.2	6.4	6.5	7.4	7.1	5.9	6.8
Source 1: Servicio Meteorológico Nacional (humidity, 1981-2000)
Source 2: Deutscher Wetterdienst (sun, 1941–1970)

== Demographics ==
=== Population dynamics ===
The Municipality of Culiacán has a total population of 858,638 inhabitants, according to the 2010 Population and Housing Census carried out by the National Institute of Statistics and Geography (INEGI). It has a population density of 166.8 inhabitants / km^{2}; the Municipality concentrates 31% of the population in the State of Sinaloa, with 422,507 men and 436,131 women, with a ratio of 96.9 men for every 100 women.

The city of Culiacán Rosales occupies only a part of the municipality of Culiacán and in 2010 had an urban area of 65 km^{2}, being the largest in the state of Sinaloa with a population of 675,773 inhabitants (of which 329,608 are men and 346,165 are women), according to the 2010 census, resulting in a population density of 10,396.5 inhabitants/km^{2}. The city concentrates 78.7% of the total urban population of the Municipality. The ethnic groups most represented in the Municipality are the Mixtec and Nahuatl, the total population of indigenous language speakers (HLI population) is 13,081 people. On the other hand, in the urban area of Culiacán, there are only 3,536 indigenous people.

The city ranks 20th in the number of foreign population, which amounts to 6,693 inhabitants, representing almost 1% of the total population; Among the main nationalities are Americans, Canadians, Spaniards, Italians, Greeks, Argentines, Cubans, Colombians, Brazilians, Chinese, Japanese, Russians, Ukrainians, Venezuelans, Dominicans, Germans, among others.

The presence of people of Greek origin in the 1940s and 1950s coincided with the incipient yet flourishing emergence of agriculture. This attracted a lot of Hellenic labor to till the land. This attracted more people; today, they make up the few thousand who continue to live in the city. It is believed that the Greek community in the city is the largest in Mexico.

Demographic evolution of Culiacán
Year	1900	1910	1920	1930	1940	1950	1960	1970	1980	1990	1995	2000	2005	2010	2015
Population	10,380	13,527	16,034	18,202	22,025	48,936	85,024	167,956	304,286	415,046	505,518	540,823	605,304	675,673	858,638

=== Housing and urbanism ===
The total number of dwellings that exist in the city is 221,144, of which only 176,799 dwellings are occupied, with an average of 3.81 inhabitants per inhabited dwelling. In general, cement roofs, walls, and floors are used for the construction of the house. However, homes and buildings do not cease to exist; most have sheet roofs and earth floors. This occurs mainly in the area south of the city, where new settlements are growing.

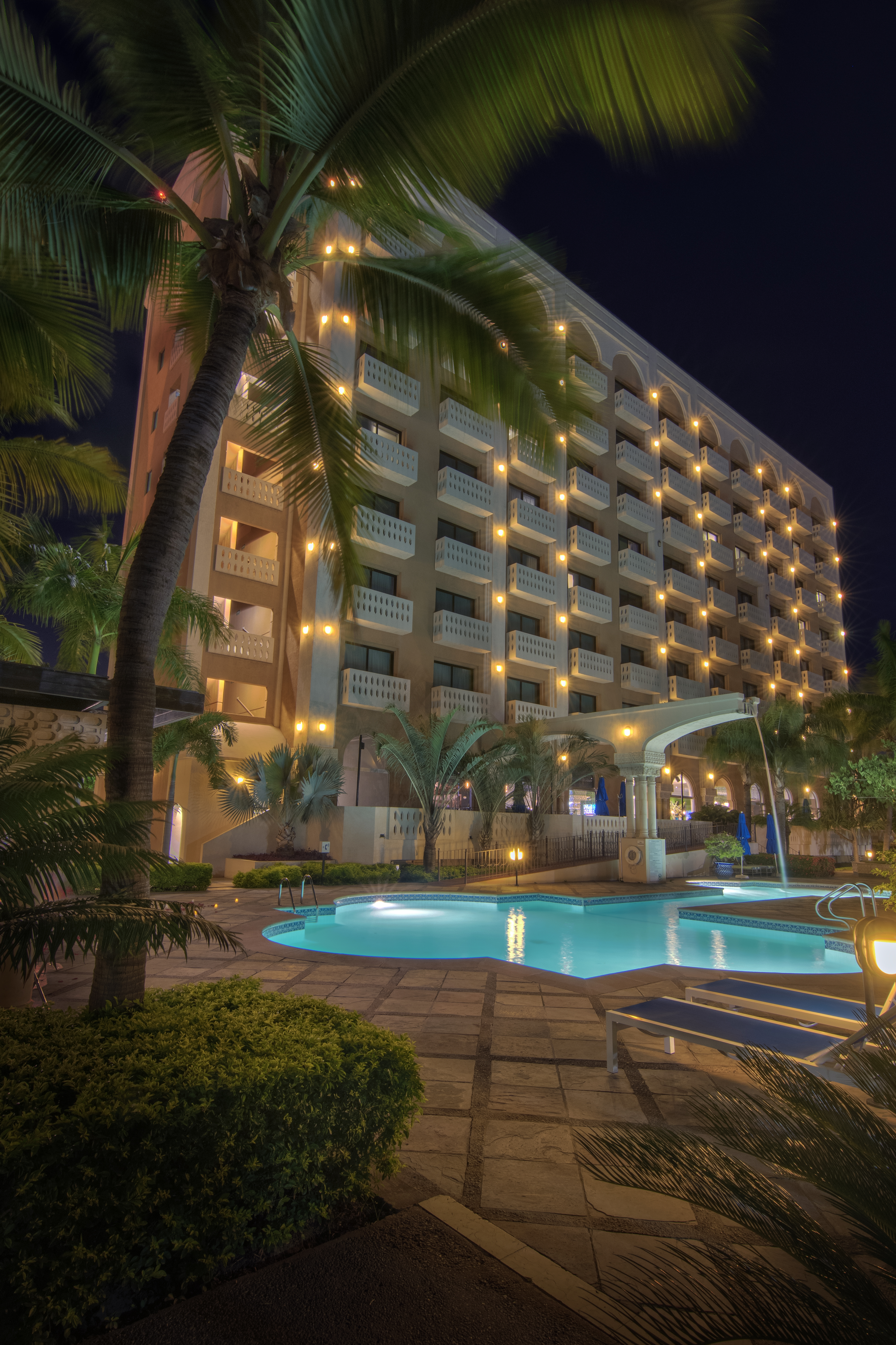
Hotel Lucerna.

Of the 176,799 occupied dwellings, 173,704 have electricity, 171,614 have piped water, 171,489 have drainage, and 169,550 have the 3 services simultaneously.

Among the noteworthy buildings are Torre Tres Ríos, Torre Santa María, Torre Tres Afluencias, Mileto 4 Ríos, Estela Corporate Center, Ceiba, BioInnova Building, Tower 120, and Dafi, all located in the Tres Ríos Urban Development district.

=== City zoning ===
The city is divided into different areas, mainly:

- The Historical Center of Culiacán is the original area of the city, in which most of the buildings of the Spanish colonization between the 16th and 19th centuries are found, it comprises a territorial extension of approximately 247,123 ha (2,471 km^{2}). From the '70s onwards, the area experienced depopulation due to high rents, the bustle of the main streets and avenues, and the prioritization of commercial space. Still, in recent years, there has been a process of repopulation of the same area, with the construction of apartments on the periphery of the center and a project of urban reorganization intended to achieve higher population density.

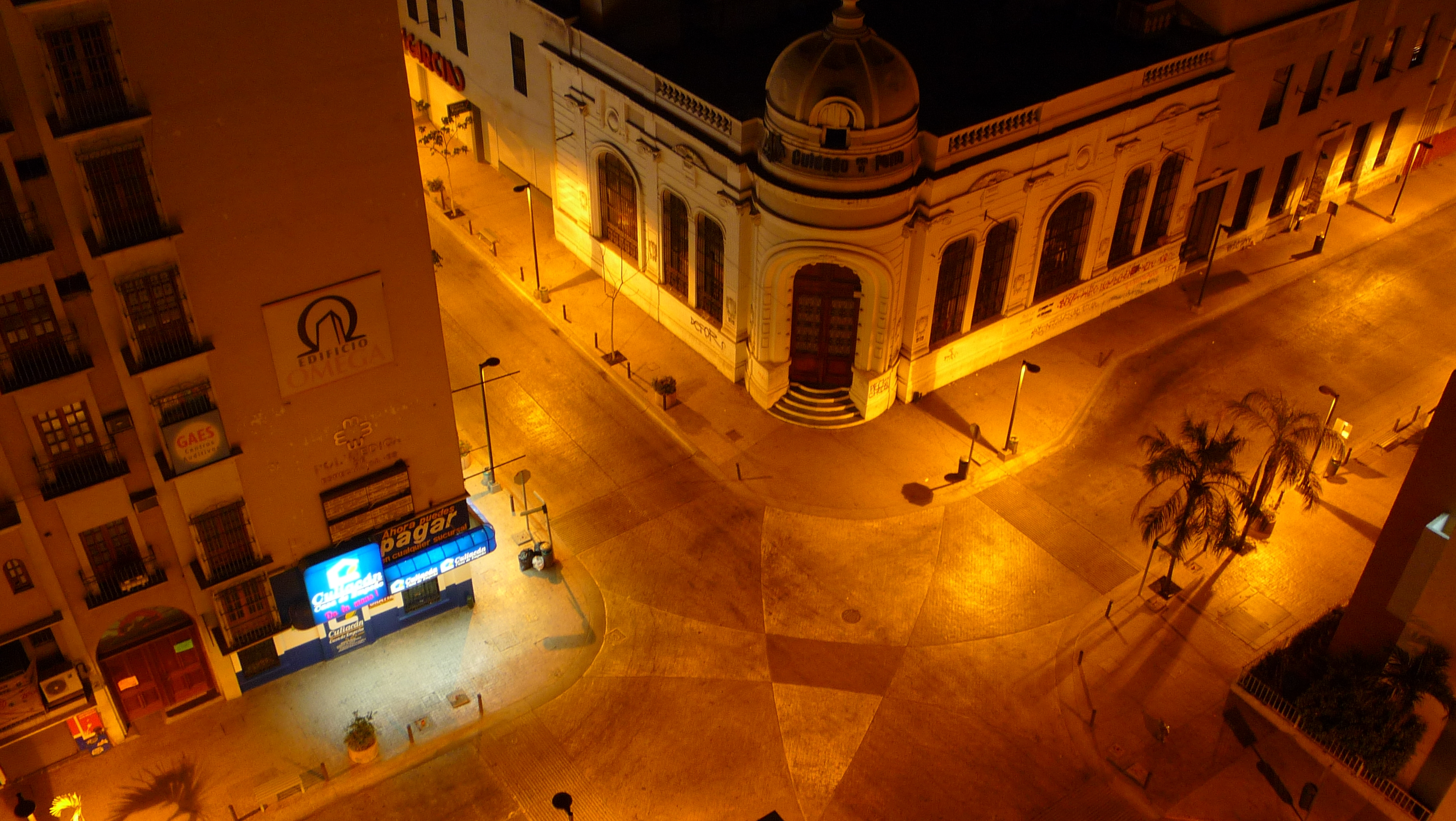
Culiacán downtown in April 2010.

- Las Colonias, which are the first settlements that populated the perimeter around the original urban area by people from different social strata. Among the best known and with the largest population, there is: Infonavit Humaya, Tierra Blanca, 6 January, Stase, Juntas de Humaya, Almada, Miguel Alemán, Centro Sinaloa, Morelos, Palmito, El Barrio, Aurora, etc.
- The subdivisions are areas developed by various construction companies, with certain sections featuring the same housing style, accommodating people from the lower-middle, middle, and upper-middle classes. Among the most well-known are: La Conquista, Villas del Rio, Valle Alto, Los Pinos, Villa Verde, and Villa Fontana. Residential areas are considered strategically built for high-income residents, featuring spacious houses and large green spaces. In most cases, they are private. Examples of these neighborhoods include: Tres Ríos, Chapultepec, Los Álamos, Guadalupe, Lomas de Guadalupe, Colinas de San Miguel, Montebello, La Campiña, Las Quintas, Isla Musalá, and La Primavera.

== Economy ==
Culiacán's economy is mainly agricultural and commercial. It is a trade center for produce, meat, and fish. Among other industries, Culiacán accounts for 32 percent of the state's economy.

Coppel, Casa Ley, Homex, and other companies are headquartered in Culiacán.

== Administrative divisions ==
Culiacán is divided into 27 sectors (sectores), which are groups of several quarters (colonias):

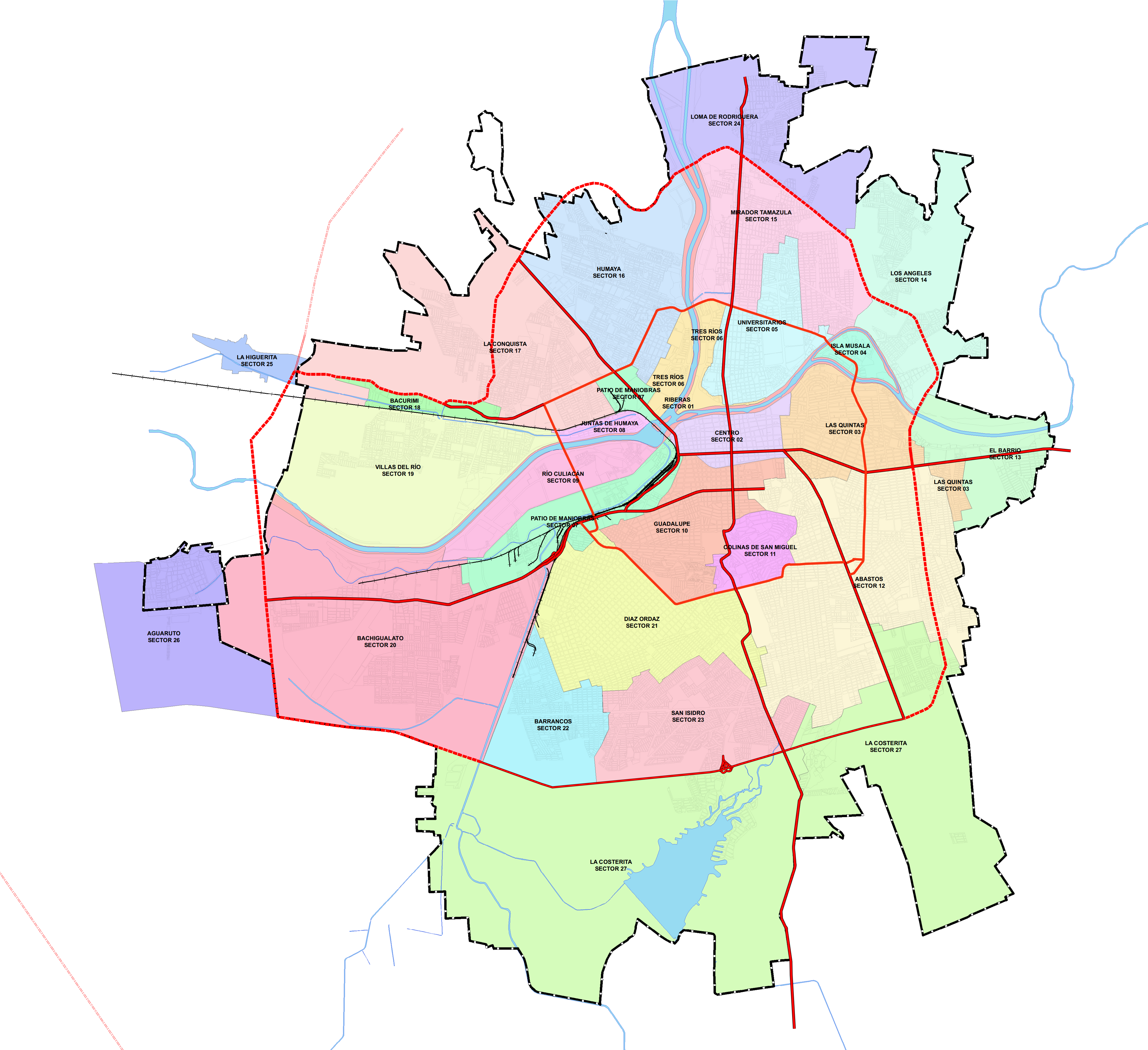
Administrative divisions of Culiacán
Demarcaciones territoriales	Sector
Riberas	01
Centro (primer cuadro)	02
Las Quintas	03
Isla Musalá	04
Universitarios	05
Tres Ríos	06
Patio de Maniobras	07
Juntas del Humaya	08
Río Culiacán	09
Guadalupe	10
Colinas de San Miguel	11
Abastos	12
El Barrio	13
Los Ángeles	14
Mirador Tamazula	15
Humaya	16
La conquista	17
Bacurimi	18
Villas del Río	19
Bachigualato	20
Díaz Ordaz	21
Barrancos	22
San Isidro	23
Loma de Rodriguera	24
La Higuerita	25
Aguaruto	26
La Costerita	27

== Education ==
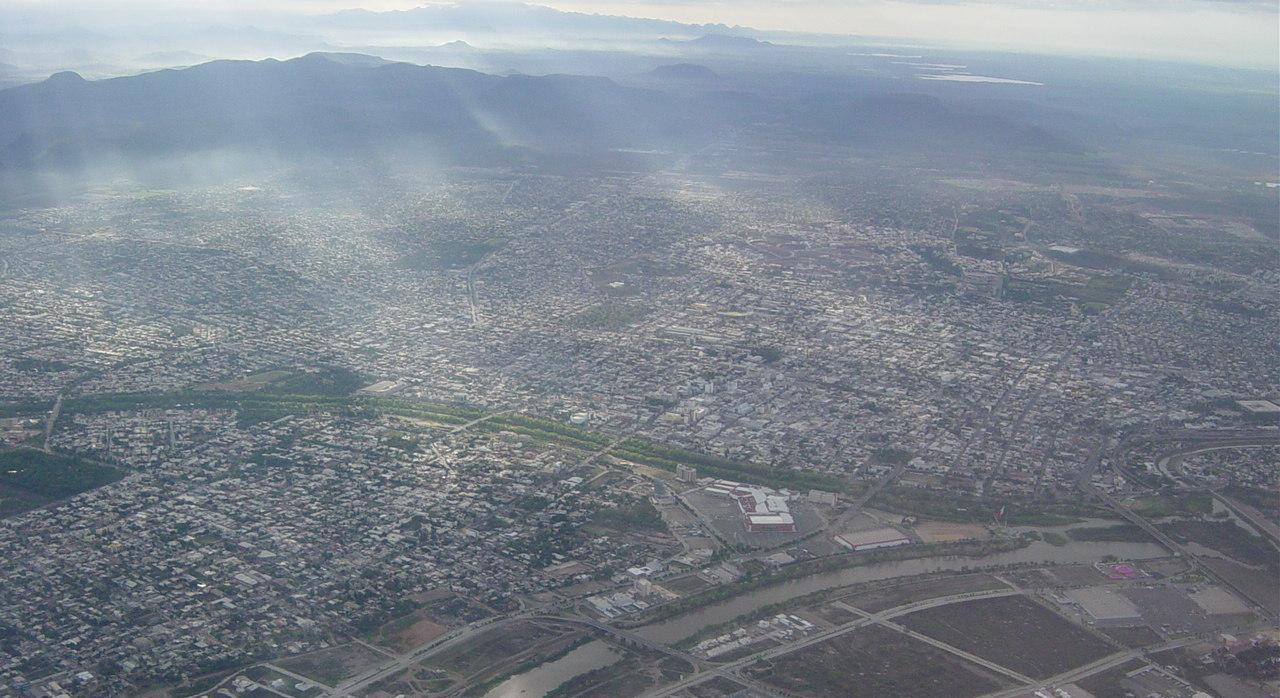
Aerial view of Culiacán

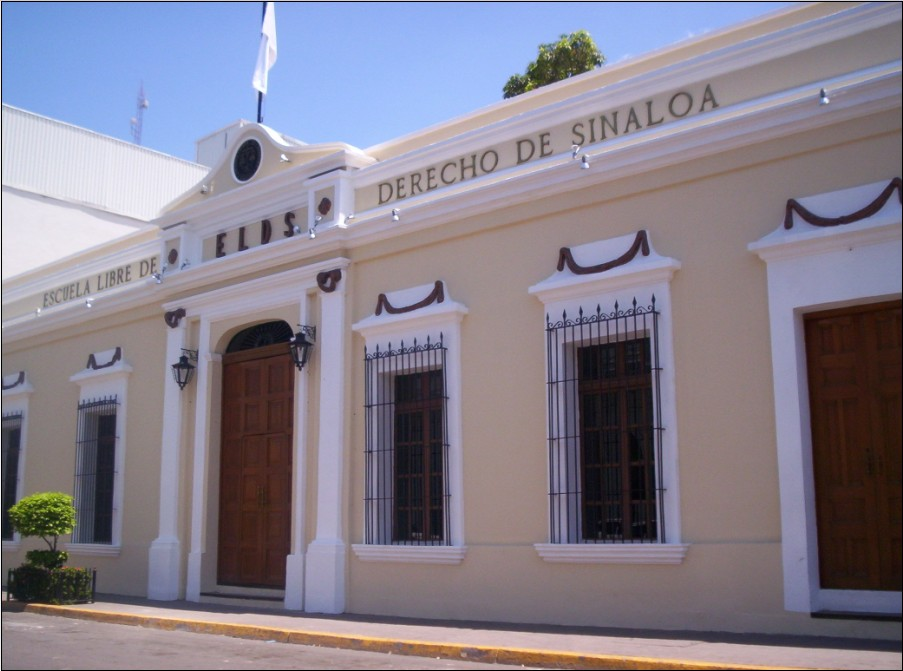
Escuela Libre de Derecho de Sinaloa

=== Universities ===
- Centro de Estudios Universitarios Superiores (CEUS)
- Escuela Libre de Derecho de Sinaloa
- Instituto Tecnológico de Culiacán
- Instituto Tecnológico y de Estudios Superiores de Monterrey (ITESM) – Campus Sinaloa
- Instituto Tecnológico Superior de Sinaloa – Campus Culiacán
- Universidad Asia-Pacífico
- Universidad Autónoma de Durango-Campus Culiacán
- Universidad Autónoma de Sinaloa
- Universidad Casa Blanca
- Universidad Católica de Culiacán
- Universidad Golfo de México – Campus Culiacán
- Universidad México Internacional
- Universidad de Occidente – Campus Culiacán
- Universidad de San Miguel (USM)
- Universidad TecMilenio – Campus Culiacán
- Universidad Tecnológica de Sinaloa
- Universidad Valle del Bravo – Campus Culiacán
- Universidad de Veracruz – Campus Culiacán
- Universidad Tecnológica de Culiacán
- Instituto Chapultepec

== Transportation ==
The Terminal de Autobuses de Culiacán or Central de Autobuses Culiacán Millennium is a bus terminal located west of Culiacán, Sinaloa, Mexico.

=== Transit system ===
==== Urban transport ====
As of 2024, Culiacán has just over 68 urban transport routes that serve about 1 million users. The Culiacán urban transport is operated by RedPlus.

==== Rail ====
The city has a train station operated by Ferromex that is used only for freight. It is connected to Mazatlán to the south and to Guaymas to the north.

==== Bus station ====
Culiacán uses the "Millennium" International Bus Station ("Central Internacional de Autobuses "Millennium) to travel across Mexico and to the United States (Arizona and California).

=== Roads and expressways ===
Though several high-speed roads have been built, most of the city's streets are rather narrow, and traffic jams are common during rush hour. There are 300,000 cars in Culiacán, making the per capita number of cars one of the highest in the country.

==== Main roads ====
Culiacán has several roads (avenues, boulevards, streets, etc.), of which some are the main motor-vehicle routes to other parts of the city.

- Álvaro Obregón Ave
- Francisco I. Madero Blvd.
- Paseo Niños Héroes
- El Dorado Ave
- Aeropuerto
- Emiliano Zapata Blvd.
- Benjamín Hill Ave
- Calzada de las Torres
- México 68
- Plan Mar de Cortés
- Heroico Colegio Militar
- Revolución Ave
- Sanalona Way
- Rolando Arjona Amabilis Blvd.
- Universitarios
- José Limón Blvd.
- Las Américas
- Diego Valadez Ríos
- Manuel J. Clouthier
- Miguel Hidalgo y Costilla
- José Vasconcelos
- Gabriel Leyva Solano Blvd.
- Xicoténcatl
- Josefa Ortíz de Domínguez
- Enrique Sanchez Alonso Blvd.
- De los Insurgentes
- Pedro Infante Blvd.
- Rotarismo Road
- Ciudades Hermanas
- Patria Ave
- Constituyentes Emiliano García
- Nicolás Bravo
- 21 de Marzo Ave
- Las Minas

==== Bridges and tunnels ====
The city has a total of 13 bridges: six across the Tamazula River, two across the Humaya River, and the longest four across the Culiacán River.

- Musalá Bridge (Tamazula River)
- Musalá-Universitaria Bridge (Tamazula River)
- Benito Juárez Bridge (Tamazula River)
- Morelos Bridge (Tamazula River)
- Miguel Hidalgo Bridge (Tamazula River)
- Juan de Dios Bátiz-Tres Ríos Bridge (Tamazula River)
- Josefa Ortíz de Domínguez Bridge (Humaya River)
- Rafael Buelna Bridge (Humaya River)
- Jorge Almada Bridge (Culiacán River)
- Black Rail Bridge (Culiacán River)
- Rolando Arjona Amabilis-UDO (Culiacán River)
- USE-Valle Alto (Culiacán River)
- Libramiento Recursos (Rosales Channel)
- Eje Federalismo Bridges (Rosales Channel)
- Chavez Castro Bridge (Rosales Channel)
- Emiliano Zapata Pass Bridge (Rosales Channel)

Also, Culiacán has bridges over streets to accommodate high transit volumes in areas with common rush hour.

- Zapata (Blvd. Emiliano Zapata)
- 280-Aeropuerto (Blvd. Aeropuerto)
- Eje Aeropuerto (Blvd. Aeropuerto-Emiliano Carranza Street)
- Mexico 15 (Plan Mar de Cortes-Mexican Federal Highway 15)
- Primavera (Plan Mar de Cortés-La Primavera)
- Eje El Trébol (Plan Mar de Cortés-Blvd. Jesús Kumate)
- Eje Federalismo Tunnels (Gabriel Leyva Solano/Francisco I. Madero-Federalismo)
- UdO (Blvd. Rolando Arjona-Blvd. Lola Beltrán) under construction
- Gasolinera del Valle (Blvd. Jesús Kumate-Blvd. Emiliano Zapata) under construction
- Japac Country (Blvd. Pedro Infante-Blvd. Rolando Arjona) spring 2013

On 17 February 2014, investigators from Mexico and the United States learned that Joaquín Guzmán Loera, or El Chapo, was using underground sewage tunnels in Culiacán by constructing hatches connecting to the drainage network in the bathtubs of his city "stash houses". On at least one occasion, authorities chased Guzman into the tunnels but lost him. An AP reporter said some of the tunnels were well-lit, had wood paneling, and were air-conditioned.

==== Highways and freeways ====
Culiacán is a rail junction and is located on the Pan-American Highway, which runs north to the United States and south to Guadalajara and Mexico City, and on the Benito Juárez Highway (Maxipista). This toll road runs parallel to the toll-free federal highway. It is connected to the north with Los Mochis and to the south with Mazatlán, Tepic, and Guadalajara with the Federal Highway 15.

- Mexican Federal Highway 15 (north: Los Mochis, south: Mazatlán)
- Sanalona Free Highway (southeast: Sanalona (exit)/Cosalá)

Culiacán is linked to the satellite city of Navolato by a freeway that now reaches Altata on the Pacific Ocean coast. Culiacán is also linked to Tamazula de Victoria in the state of Durango.

- Freeway 280-30 (west: Navolato-Altata)
- Freeway 3-225 (north: Melchor Ocampo-Guamuchil)
- Freeway 5-325 (south: Costa Rica-El Dorado)
- Tamazula Interstate Freeway (northeast: Sanalona-Tamazula de Victoria)

=== Airport ===
Culiacán is served by Federal de Bachigualato International Airport (IATA: CUL, ICAO: MMCL), the most important domestic gateway in the state of Sinaloa, and the second in international operations after Mazatlán International Airport. It is located south of downtown; it is also the 10th Mexican Air Force base.

== Entertainment ==
=== Tourism ===
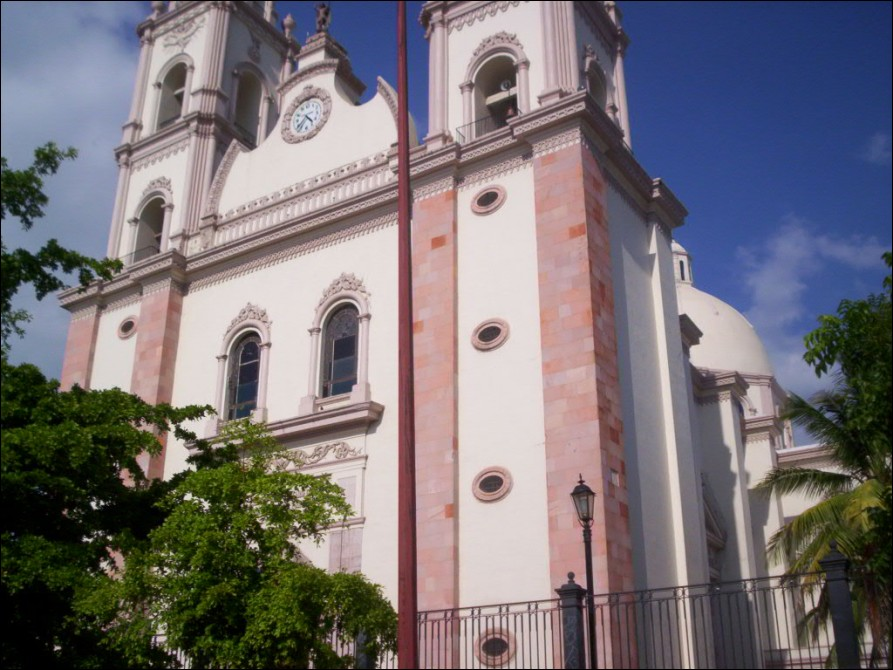
Culiacán Cathedral

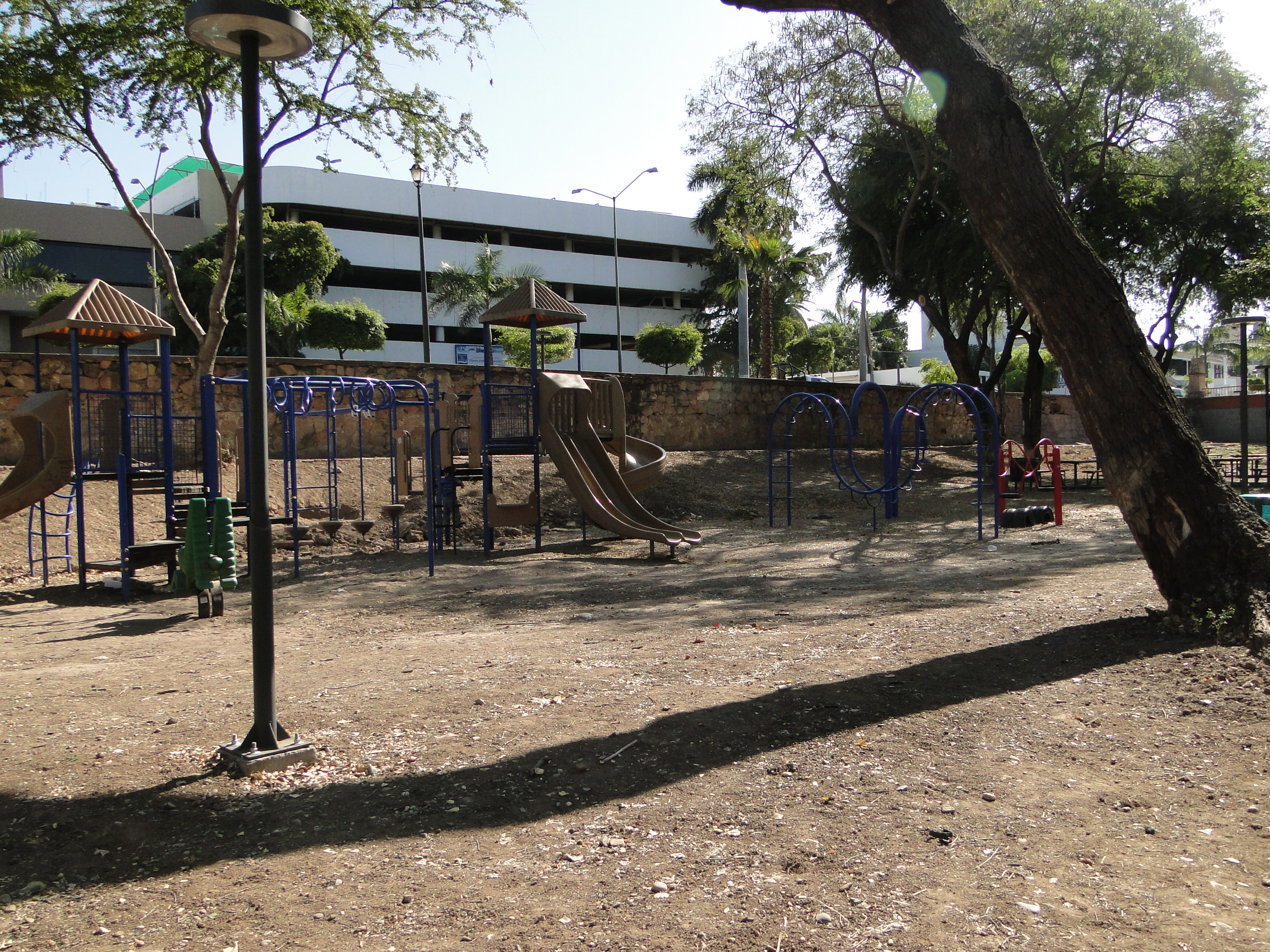
Las Riveras Park on Old Waterfront

- Culiacán Cathedral, a 19th-century church, began construction in the 1830s.
- Plazuela Alvaro Obregón was the place for social gatherings in the 1800s.
- La Lomita or Templo de Nuestra Señora de Guadalupe is the tallest church in Culiacán, situated on a hill with a view of the entire city.
- The Regional History Museum in the "Parque Constitución", a large art museum downtown, and several small art galleries, is owned by several local universities.
- The Botanical Garden and Centro de Ciencias de Sinaloa, a science museum, holds the fifth-largest meteorite on earth.
- A baseball stadium, the Estadio Angel Flores, is the home of Los Tomateros de Culiacán; a bigger football arena, called Estadio Banorte (formerly Estadio Carlos González), is the home of Los Dorados de Sinaloa, a Mexican football team.
- In addition, this city has a unique gastronomic diversity in its style.
- Near the city there are many places to visit.

=== Las Riberas Park ===
Parque Las Riberas (in Spanish) is the area attached to the Tamazula and Humaya rivers. Various tree species, such as willows, poplars, Guamúchiles, and eucalyptus, can be seen. The White Bimodal Bridge, which connects the park to the city center, facilitates pedestrian access and, at night, becomes a light show that contrasts with the Black Bridge in Culiacán.

=== Culiacán Botanical Garden ===
Located to the east of the city, this 10 hectares (0.10 km^{2}) area is home to diverse ecosystems, hundreds of plant and tree species, and the art installation Encounters by James Turrell. The Culiacán Botanical Garden has more than 2,000 plant species.

=== Orabá Island ===
Orabá Island, as its name indicates, is an island between the confluence of the Tamazula River and the Humaya River, where the Culiacán River is formed. It is part of a series of parks and gardens built along the banks of the three rivers.

=== Culiacán Zoo ===
Located next to the heart of the city, as part of the Civic Center Constitución, which extends to 13.5 hectares (0.135 km^{2}), it houses 1,400 animals from more than 450 species, including mammals, reptiles, and birds.

=== Tres Ríos water park ===
The Tres Ríos Water Park is a recreational area built at the confluence of the Humaya and Tamazula rivers. The park is very close to Parque Las Riberas. It is the largest and most visited park in the country's northwest.

=== Dancing fountains ===
The dancing or dancing fountains of Culiacán are an attraction of hundreds of independent fountains programmed to "dance" to the sound of typical Sinaloan music. This show is presented every day at the 3 Ríos Project where the flagpole stands, specifically at the confluence of the Humaya and Tamazula rivers.

=== Obregón Square ===
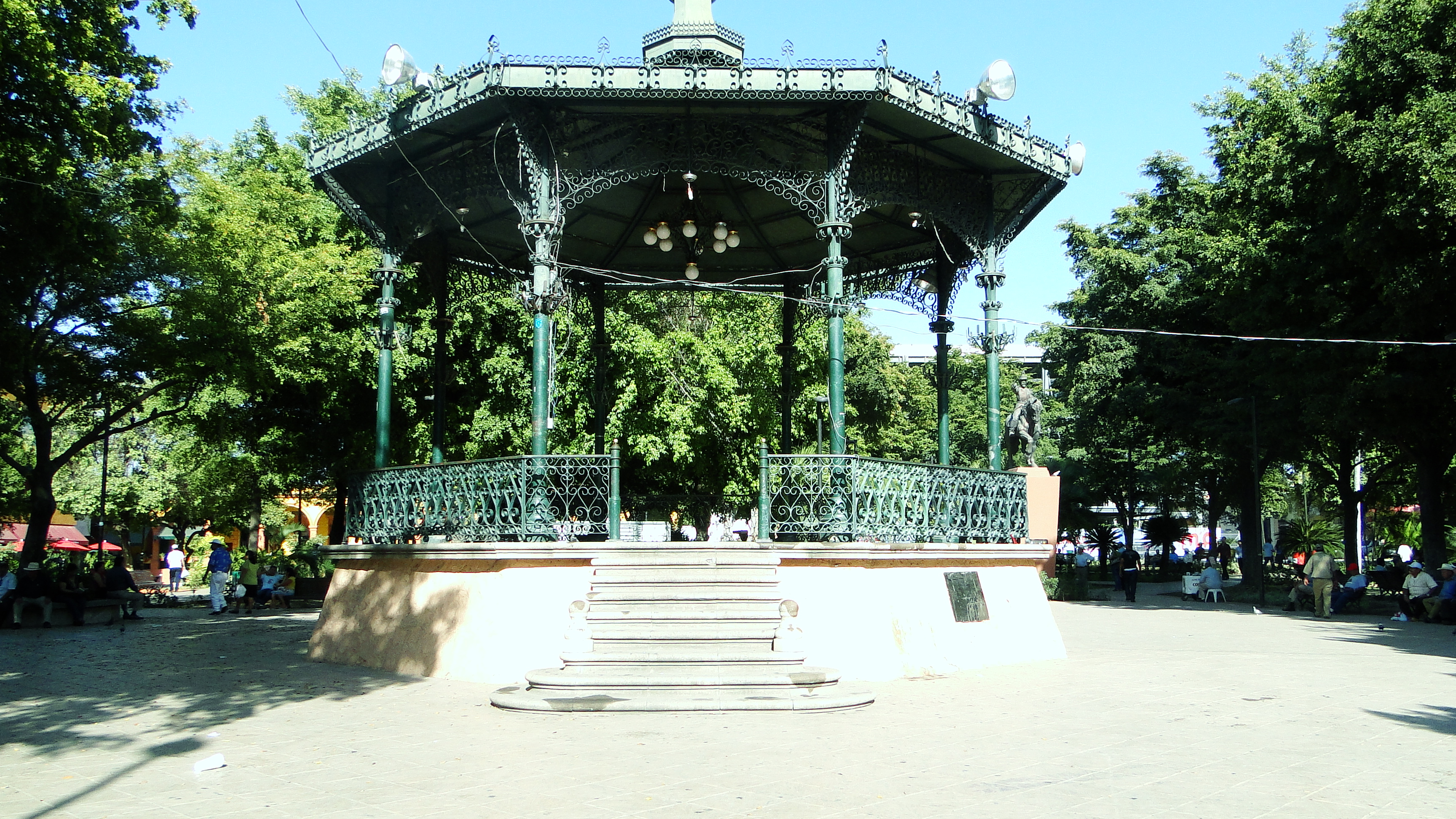
Kiosk in the Álvaro Obregón square.

Located on Álvaro Obregón Avenue.

=== Sports ===
The city is home to three professional league sports teams: baseball with the Tomateros de Culiacán from the Liga Mexicana del Pacífico, two championships in Caribbean series in 1996 and 2002; and football with Dorados de Sinaloa, who play at the Estadio Banorte (Estadio Carlos González) and basketball with the Caballeros de Culiacán from the CIBACOPA. Duck, dove, and goose hunting season goes from early November through March. Culiacán also hosts an annual international marathon.

=== Media ===
The newspapers El Debate and El Noroeste are published in Culiacán.

== Notable people ==
=== Sciences ===
- Carmen Victoria Félix Chaidez

=== Entertainment ===
- Yolanda Andrade, TV host
- Luis Campos, drummer (Collinz Room, Noelia)
- Cesar Millan, dog trainer
- Paul Rodriguez, Hollywood actor and talk show host
- Chalino Sánchez, Mexican singer
- Sheyla Tadeo, actress and comedian

=== Sports ===
- Irene Aldana (born 1988), mixed martial artist
- Julio César Chávez, boxer with six world championships in three weight divisions
- Julio César Chávez, Jr., former Middleweight champion
- Omar Chávez, welterweight contender prospect
- Óliver Pérez, Major League Baseball player
- Alberto Medina, footballer
- Jared Borgetti, footballer
- Jorge Iván Estrada, footballer
- Héctor Moreno, footballer
- Julio Urías, Major League Baseball player, World Series champion
- Joey Meneses, Major League Baseball
- Ozziel Herrera, footballer
- Jesús Ricardo Angulo (born 1997), Mexican football winger
- Jesús Alberto Angulo (born 1998), Mexican football defender

=== Modeling ===
- Paulina Flores Arias, Miss Mexico 2000, model
- Rosa María Ojeda, Miss México 2006
- Laura Elena Zuniga Huizar, Miss Mexico 2008, Miss Latinoamericana 2008, model
- Perla Judith Beltrán Acosta, Miss Mexico 2009, 2009 Miss World, model

=== Crime ===
- Benjamín Arellano Félix, Mexican drug lord, founder of Tijuana Cartel.
- Carlos Arellano Félix, Mexican drug lord.
- Francisco Rafael Arellano Félix, Mexican drug lord.
- Ovidio Guzmán López, Mexican drug lord
- Ramón Arellano Félix, Mexican drug lord, founder of Tijuana Cartel.
- Miguel Ángel Félix Gallardo, Mexican drug lord, founder of Guadalajara Cartel.
- Joaquín "El Chapo" Guzmán, Mexican drug lord.

=== Other ===
- Sandra Luz Hernández, activist.

== Gallery ==
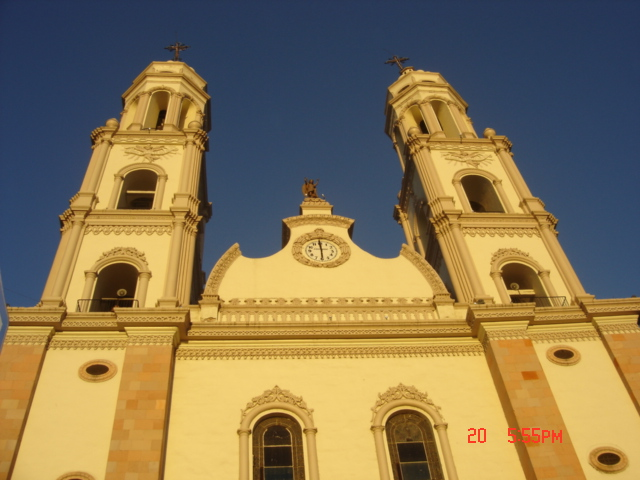
Culiacán Cathedral

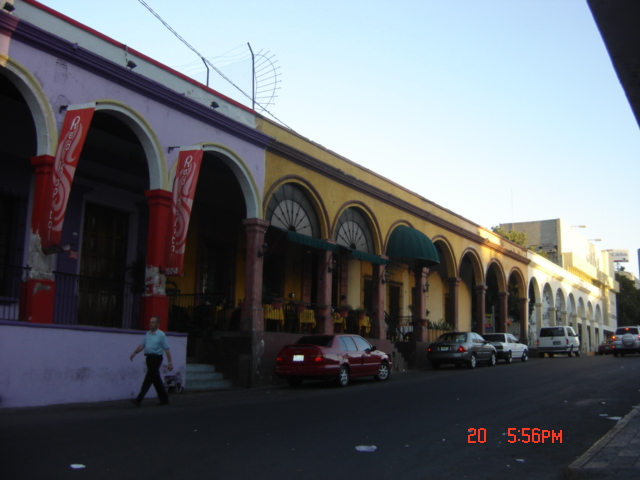
Culiacán's downtown

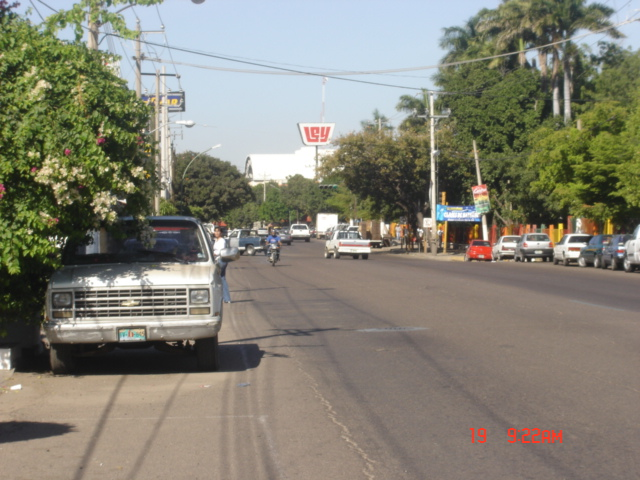
Culiacán street

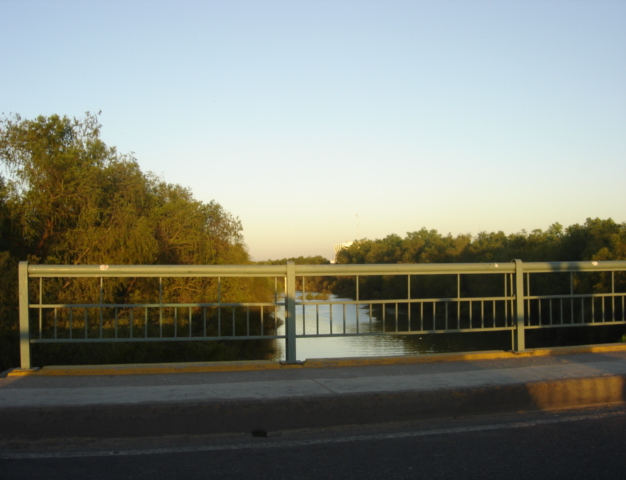
Culiacán River by Sinaloa Blvd

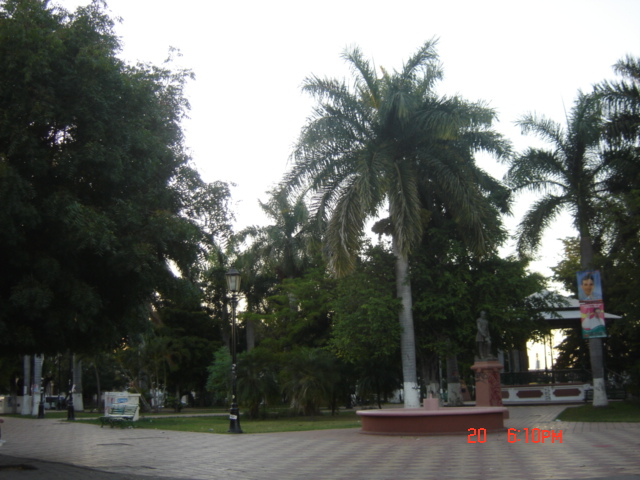
"La Plazuela Rosales"

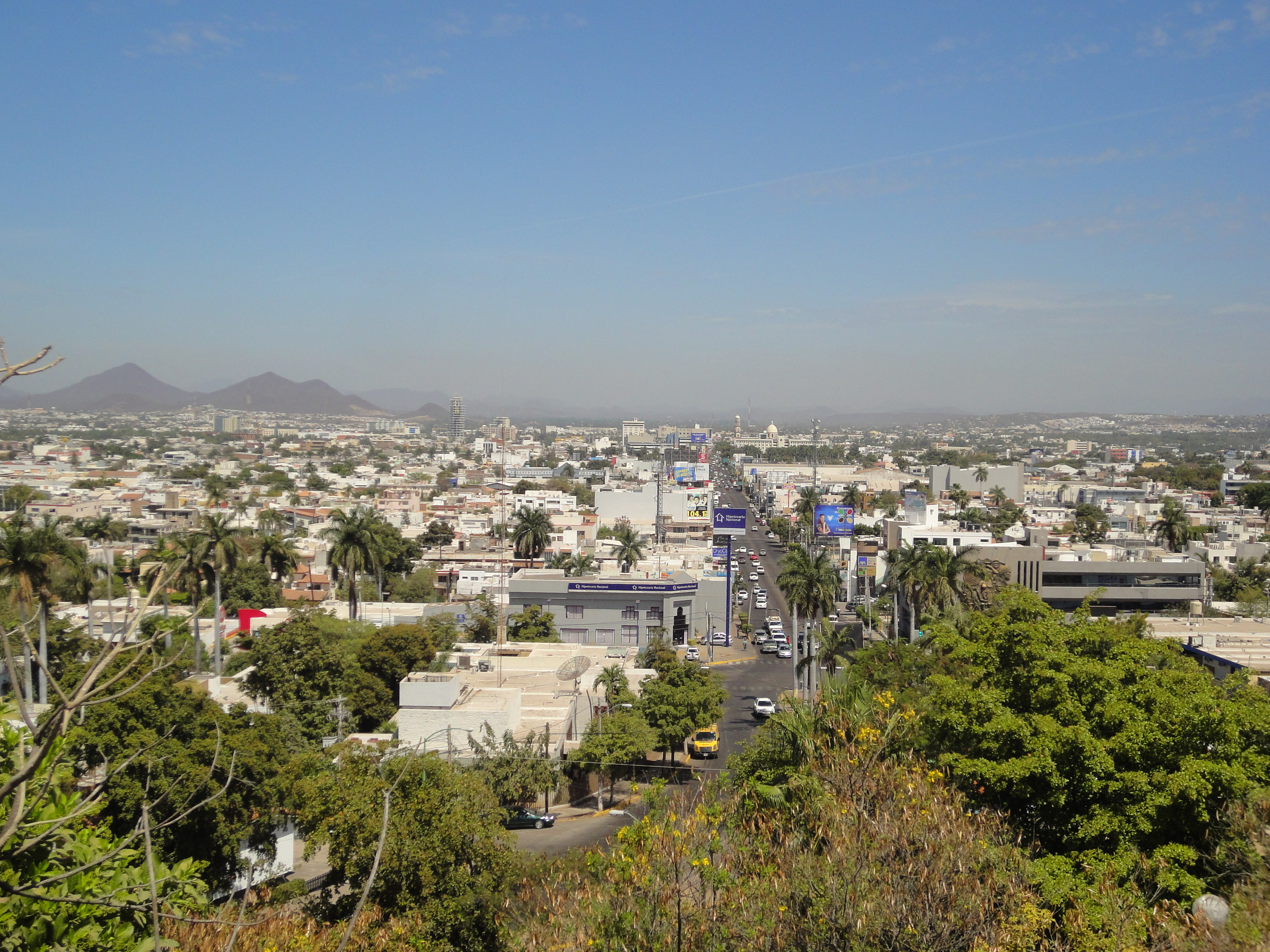
View north of Avenida Prol. Álvaro Obregón from Mirador La Lomita

== See also ==
- Aguaruto
- Culiacáncito
