= Culiacán Municipality =

Municipality in the Mexican state of Sinaloa

Municipality of Culiacán Municipio de Culiacán
- Municipality
- Coat of arms

- Location of the municipality in Sinaloa
- Coordinates: 24.808°N 107.397°W
- Country: Mexico
- State: Sinaloa
- Foundation: 1915
- Seat: Culiacán Rosales

Government
  - Municipal president: Ana Miriam Ramos Villarreal (interim)
  - Federal electoral district: Sinaloa's 5th, 6th & 7th

Area
  - Total: 4,758 km^{2} (1,837 sq mi)

Population (2020)
  - Total: 1,003,530
  - Density: 180.5/km^{2} (467/sq mi)
- Time zone: UTC–07:00 (Zona Pacífico)
- Area code: +52 667
- Website: culiacan.gob.mx

Culiacán is a municipality in the state of Sinaloa in northwestern Mexico. It is the most populous municipality in Sinaloa.

The municipal seat is the state capital, the city of Culiacán.

== Political subdivision ==
The municipality of Culiacán is subdivided into 17 sindicaturas:

- El Salado
  - El Álamo
- Higueras de Abuya
- Baila
- Aguaruto
- Emiliano Zapata
- Adolfo López Mateos (El Tamarindo)
- Jesús María
- Las Tapias
- Quilá
- Sanalona
- San Lorenzo
- Tacuichamona
- Tepuche
- Imala
- Costa Rica
- Culiacancito
- Las Flechas

Eldorado was formerly the eighteenth sindicatura of Culiacán, but it became an independent municipality in 2021.

== See also ==
- Media related to Culiacán Municipality at Wikimedia Commons
