= Villa Unión, Sinaloa =

Town in the Mexican state of Sinaloa

Villa Unión
- Locality
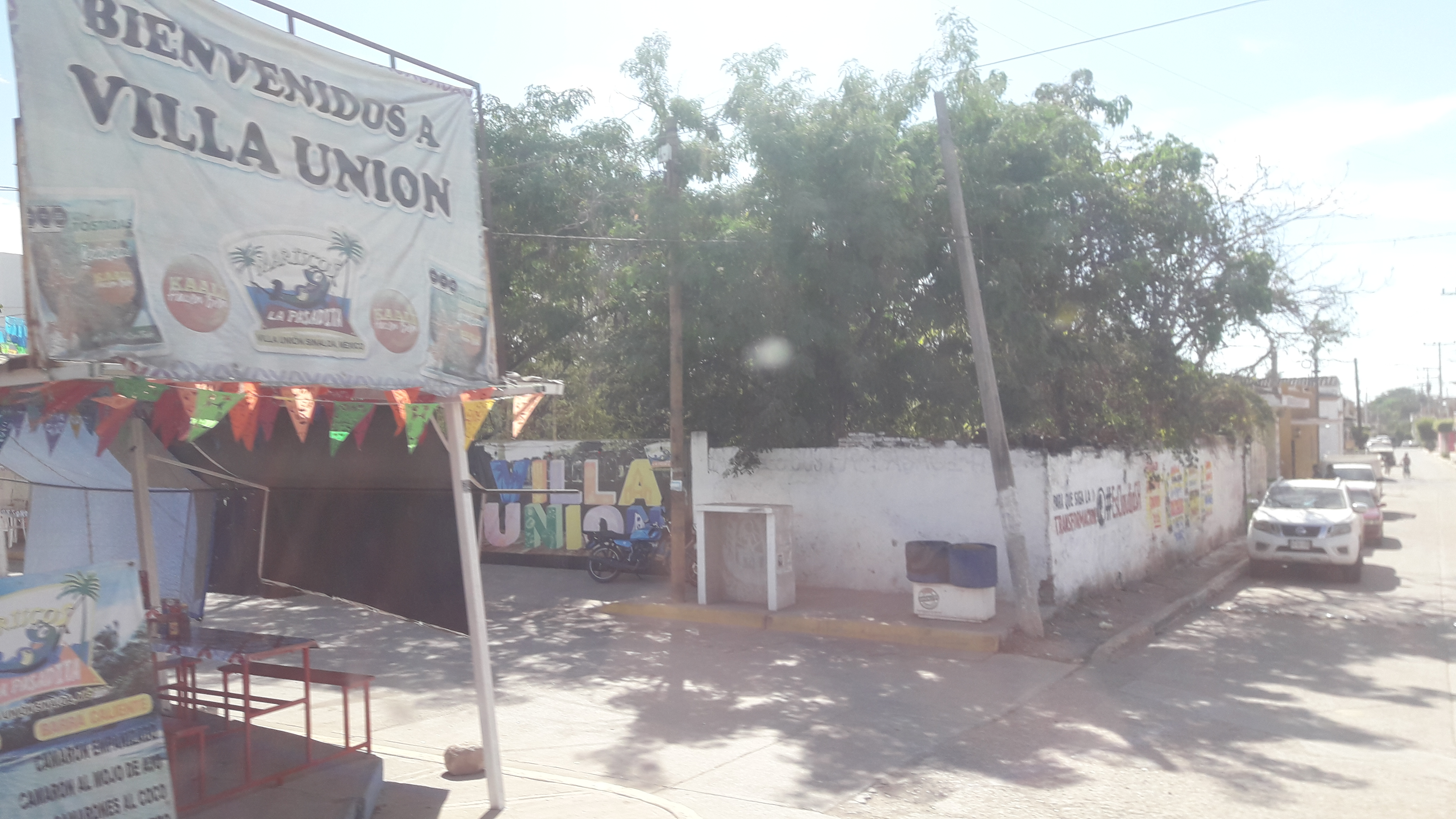
- Villa Unión in 2022

- Location in Mexico
- Coordinates: 23°11′18″N 106°12′57″W
- Country: Mexico
- State: Sinaloa
- Municipality: Mazatlán

Population (2010)
  - Total: 13,404
  - Ethnicities: Mestizos
  - Religions: Roman Catholic Church
- Time zone: UTC-7 (Pacific (US Mountain))
- Postal code: 82210
- Area code: 669

Villa Unión is the second largest town in the municipality of Mazatlán, after the port of Mazatlán. It is located twenty kilometers south of the city on the banks of the Presidio River.

To the south of the town lies El Walamo, and El Roble lies to the north.
