= El Recodo, Sinaloa =

Town in the Mexican state of Sinaloa

El Recodo
- Town
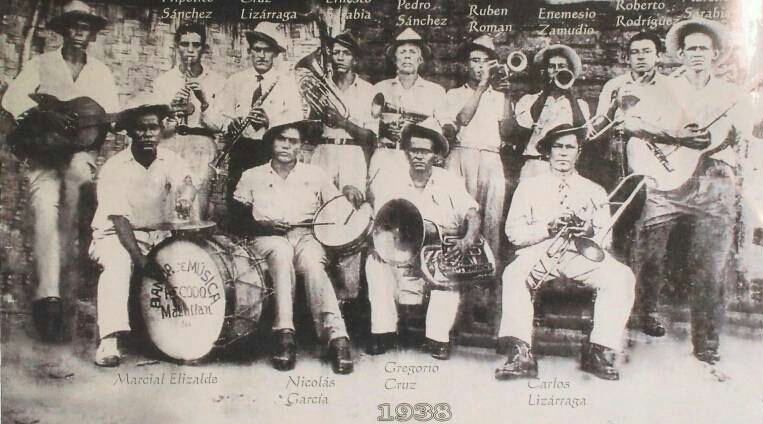
- Members of the Banda El Recodo in their natal town in 1938
- Interactive map of El Recodo
- Coordinates: 23.405621°N 106.212931°W
- Country: Mexico
- State: Sinaloa
- Municipality: Mazatlán

Population
  - Total: 630
- Time zone: UTC-7 (Pacific (US Mountain))
- Postal code: 82233
- Area code: 669

El Recodo is a Mexican town located in Mazatlán Municipality. Its current name was given in 1822 due to the angle formed by the Presidio River. It is located 27.3 kilometers southeast of Mazatlán. It has a population of 630 inhabitants. It is located at 55 meters above sea level. In this town the Banda El Recodo was founded in 1938. Among its tourist sites, the Church of the Virgin of the Holy Cross stands out, built in 1850 and the house of Don Cruz Lizárraga. Livestock farming, agriculture and saddlery are practiced in the town.
