= Mazatlán Municipality =

Municipality in the Mexican state of Sinaloa

Coordinates: 23°04′25″N 105°00′00″W

Mazatlán Municipality Municipio de Mazatlán
- Municipality
- Coat of arms

- Location of the municipality in Sinaloa
- Country: Mexico
- State: Sinaloa
- Seat: Mazatlán
- No. of Sindicaturas: 8

Government
  - Municipal president: Carlos Eduardo Felton González

Area
  - Total: 3,068.48 km^{2} (1,184.75 sq mi)

Population (2010)
  - Total: 438,434
- Time zone: UTC–07:00 (Zona Pacífico)
- Area code: +52 669
- Website: Mazatlán Government page

Mazatlán is a municipality in the Mexican state of Sinaloa in northwestern Mexico, being the most densely populated municipality in Sinaloa.

== Political subdivision ==
Mazatlán Municipality is subdivided in 8 sindicaturas:

- Villa Unión
- El Recodo
- El Quelite
- Mármol
- El Roble
- Siqueros
- La Noria
- El Habal

Other settlements:

- El Walamo
