= El Walamo =

- Locality
- Location in Mexico
- Coordinates: 23°8′15″N 106°14′48″W
- Country: Mexico
- State: Sinaloa
- Municipality: Mazatlán

Area
  - Total: 1.043 km^{2} (0.403 sq mi)

Population (2020)
  - Total: 3,550
- Time zone: UTC-7

El Walamo (also known historically as Valamo) is a locality in the municipality of Mazatlán, Sinaloa, Mexico. It is located 25 kilometers south of the city of Mazatlán. The town has a population of 3,550 according to a 2020 census.

== Economy ==
El Walamo is primarily an agricultural region, focusing on chili, tomatoes, beans and corn.

== History ==
The city was founded by agarian peasants in 1935.
