= Presidio River =

River in Mexico

- Location of mouth

Location
- Country: Mexico
- State: Sinaloa

Physical characteristics
- Mouth
  - coordinates: 23°05′39″N 106°17′27″W
  - elevation: Sea level
- Basin size: 6,479 km^{2} (2,502 sq mi)

The Presidio River is a river of Mexico. It originates in the mountains of Durango, flowing south-southwesterly into Sinaloa before joining the Pacific Ocean southeast of Mazatlán. The watershed measures 6,479 km^{2} (2,502 sq mi).

== See also ==
- List of rivers of Mexico
