= Mazatlán =

City in Sinaloa, Mexico

- City
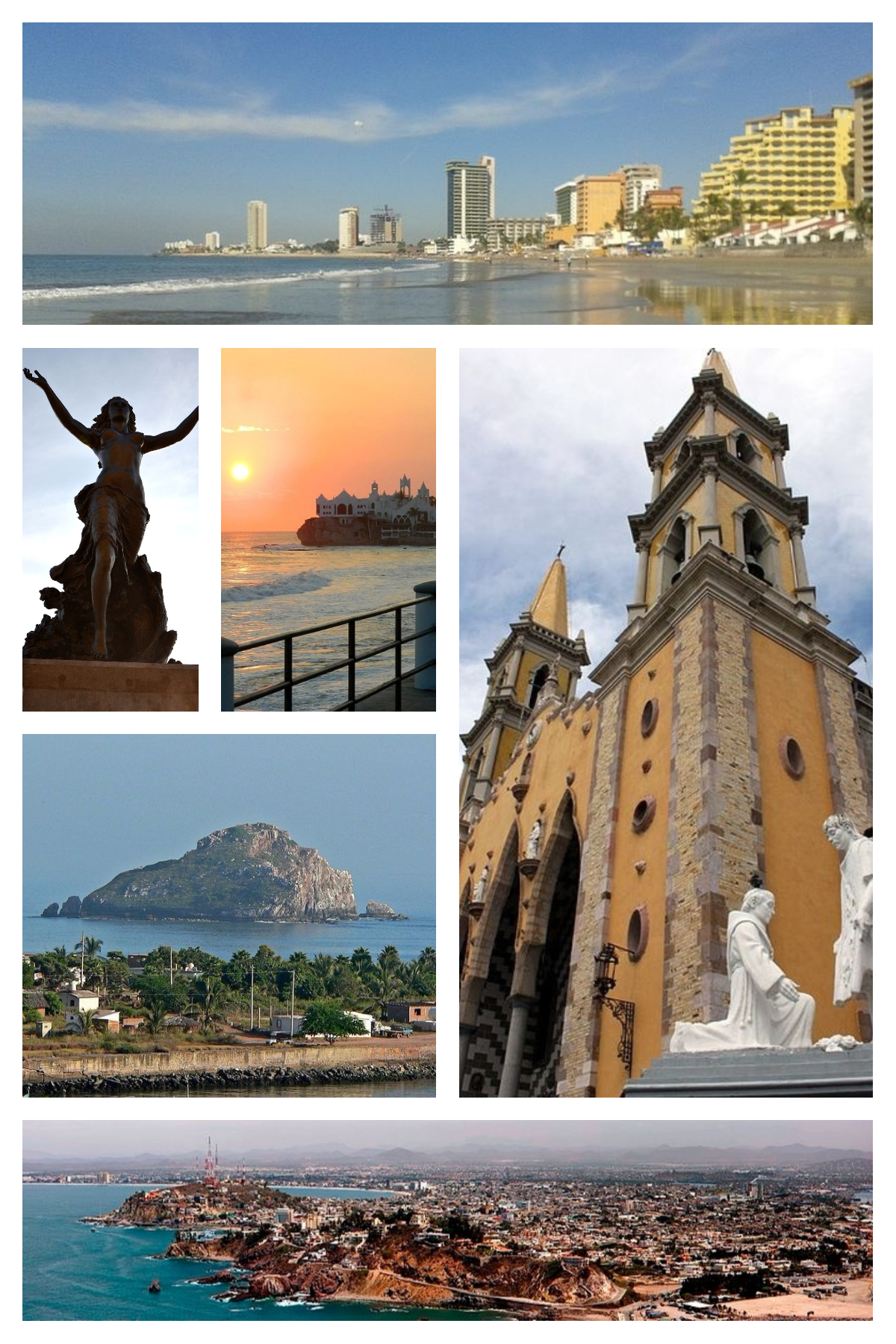
- From upper left: Hotel Zone, Monument to Mazatleca women, Mazatlán pier, Cordones Island, Mazatlán Cathedral, Panoramic view of the city

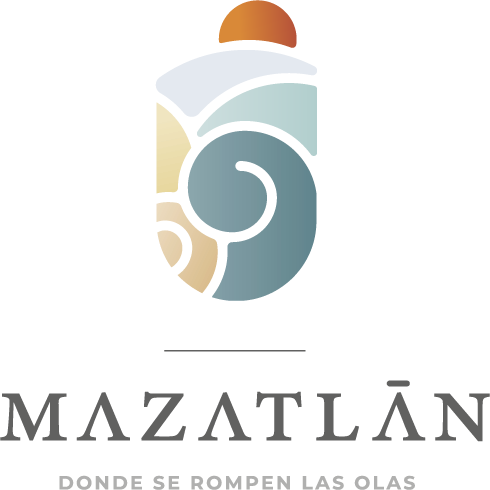
- Coat of arms Logo
- Nicknames: Pacific Pearl, Fish Land
- Mazatlán in Sinaloa Mazatlán in Mexico
- Coordinates: 23°13′N 106°25′W
- Country: Mexico
- State: Sinaloa
- Municipality: Mazatlán
- Settled: 14 May 1531

Government
  - Mayor: Estrella Palacios Domínguez

Area
  - City: 82 km^{2} (32 sq mi)
- Elevation: 10 m (33 ft)
- Highest elevation (Cerro del Crestón): 157 m (515 ft)
- Lowest elevation (Pacific Ocean): 0 m (0 ft)

Population (2020)
  - City: 441,975
  - Density: 5,400/km^{2} (14,000/sq mi)
  - Municipality: 501,441
  - Religion: Roman Catholic Church
- Demonym(s): Mazatleco, Mazatleca

GDP (PPP, constant 2015 values)
  - Year: 2023
  - Total (Metro area): $9.2 billion
  - Per capita: $19,200
- Time zone: UTC−07:00 (Zona Pacífico)
- Postal code: 82000
- Area code: +52 669
- Climate: Aw
- Waterways: Estero del Infiernillo, Laguna del Camarón, Estero del Yugo
- Airports: Mazatlán International Airport
- Public transit: Autotransportes Águilas del Pacífico
- Railroads: Ferromex Mazatlán Station
- Website: www.mazatlan.gob.mx

Mazatlán (Spanish pronunciation: [masaˈtlan]) is a city in the Mexican state of Sinaloa. The city serves as the municipal seat for the surrounding municipio, known as the Mazatlán Municipality. It is located on the Pacific coast across from the southernmost tip of the Baja California peninsula.

Mazatlán is a Nahuatl word for 'place of deer'. The city was populated by many indigenous people when the Spanish conquistadors arrived in 1531 and began to colonize it. By the mid-19th century, a large group of immigrants arrived from Germany. Over time, Mazatlán developed into a commercial seaport, importing equipment for the nearby gold and silver mines. It served as the capital of Sinaloa from 1859 to 1873. The German settlers also influenced the local music, banda, with some genres being an alteration of Bavarian folk music. The settlers established the Pacifico Brewery on 14 March 1900. Mazatlán has a rich culture and art community; in addition to the Angela Peralta Theater, the city has many galleries, museums and buildings of historic value.

With a population of 441,975 in the 2020 census, Mazatlán is the second-largest city in the state of Sinaloa, after the capital Culiacán. It is also a popular tourist destination, with its beaches lined with resort hotels. A car ferry crosses the Gulf of California, from Mazatlán to La Paz, Baja California Sur. The municipality has a land area of 3,068.48 km^{2} (1,184.75 sq mi) and includes smaller outlying communities such as Villa Unión, La Noria, El Quelite, and El Habal. Mazatlán is served by Mazatlán International Airport.

== Etymology ==
Mazatlán etymologically comes from the Nahuatl language and means "Land of deer" (mazatl "deer" and tlan referring to a place abundant with something).

Originally, the name Presidio of Mazatlán was used for what is now called Villa Unión. The port of Mazatlán served as a reference to arrive to Presidio by sea, and was called the Islands of Mazatlán. By decree of the Estado de Occidente, on September 11, 1828, Presidio of Mazatlán was renamed Villa of the Union. This freed the name Mazatlán (land of deer), and since the port was known as Islas de Mazatlán, the name was adopted.

== History ==
=== Early settlers ===
Indigenous groups were in the region of Mazatlán prior to the arrival of the Spanish. These groups included the Totorames, who lived from the south bank of the River Piaxtla to the Río de las Cañas, as well as the Xiximes, who lived in the mountains in the bordering state of Durango.

=== Colonial period ===
During the early years of the Spanish conquest in Sinaloa, the region currently occupied by the municipality of Mazatlán remained uninhabited. The nearest town was Chametla, which was occupied by the Spanish in 1531, and lent its name to the province, despite being abandoned shortly afterward.

The city was colonized in 1531 by an army of Spaniards.

In 1534, the Valley of Mazatlán was divided into 25 Castellanos by an unknown person who did not stay there for long. In 1576, Don Hernando de Bazán, Governor and Captain General of Nueva Vizcaya, sent Captain Martín Hernández with his father, brothers, and soldiers to occupy the site of Mazatlán, granting them land and titles in return. The Captain's claims were ratified in the City of Durango in 1639, and endorsed in the same city in 1650.

Nuño de Guzmán's entry to Sinaloa in 1531, and the appointment of the conquered lands as provinces, prompted the internal territorial division of the State. Chametla was occupied by the Spanish, and listed the province extending from the Rio Cañas Elota to the boundary with the province of Culiacán. Both provinces belonged to the kingdom of New Galicia.

In 1565, the town of Chametla was gradually diminished by ongoing Indian raids. That year, Captain Francisco de Ibarra recovered the territory south of the state, rebuilt Chametla, and founded the Villa de San Sebastián (known today as Concordia), and awarded the region to Nueva Vizcaya, New Spain. The provinces under his jurisdiction included the villages of San Sebastián, Charcas, Copala and Pánuco.

During the last years of the seventeenth century and early eighteenth century, the territory within Sinaloa remained unchanged, until 1732, when the provinces of Sonora and Ostimuri were united, as were the provinces of Sinaloa, Culiacán, and Rosario, with San Felipe and Santiago being the principal cities.

In 1749, Sinaloa was divided into five provinces with their mayors and lieutenancy: Maloya, with jurisdiction over Chametla, Rosario, and San José; Copala, with jurisdiction over San Ignacio, Piaxtla, and Mazatlán; Culiacán, with jurisdiction over Badiraguato, and Sinaloa, which bordered the Mayo River.

In 1786, the intendant system was implemented due to the need to establish a provincial government. Arizpe Municipality was formed out of the territories of Sonora and Sinaloa. That year, the first mayor, Garrido Durán, established eleven subdelegations, eight of them in Sinaloa, with Mazatlán being within the subdelegation of Copala, which was later called San Sebastián.

=== Independent Mexico ===
Among the first decrees that the legislature enacted was that the addition of each of the eleven districts, and this union, corresponding to the Union Villa Mariano Balleza, be given the name of one of the leading insurgents, parish priest Dolores Hidalgo, on the night of September 15, 1810.

In 1813, the Cadiz constitution came into effect. Article 310 of that constitution provided for the installation of local councils in towns that had more than 1,000 inhabitants. In 1814, Fernando VII repealed that constitution but it was later reinstated in 1820, and the first municipalities in Sinaloa were founded.

In the late eighteenth and early nineteenth century, Mazatlán was a native fishing village located north of Cerro de la Aduana. In 1821, it was declared the first port of Mazatlán on Mexico's Pacific coast.

Jurisdictionally, Mazatlán remained dependent on the sub-delegation of San Sebastian, unaffected by the divisions between the states of Sonora and Sinaloa. In 1824, they got together to form the Western State. After the imposition of new internal divisions of five departments and municipalities divided into parties, Mazatlán was in the department of San Sebastian, which was formed with the parties of its name, San Ignacio and the Rosary, and it extended to the River of Reeds.

In 1830, the Western State was divided into two states. The first constitution of the state of Sinaloa, promulgated on December 12, 1831, divided the territory into eleven districts with their respective parties, leaving the district town of La Union separated from Concord and San Ignacio.

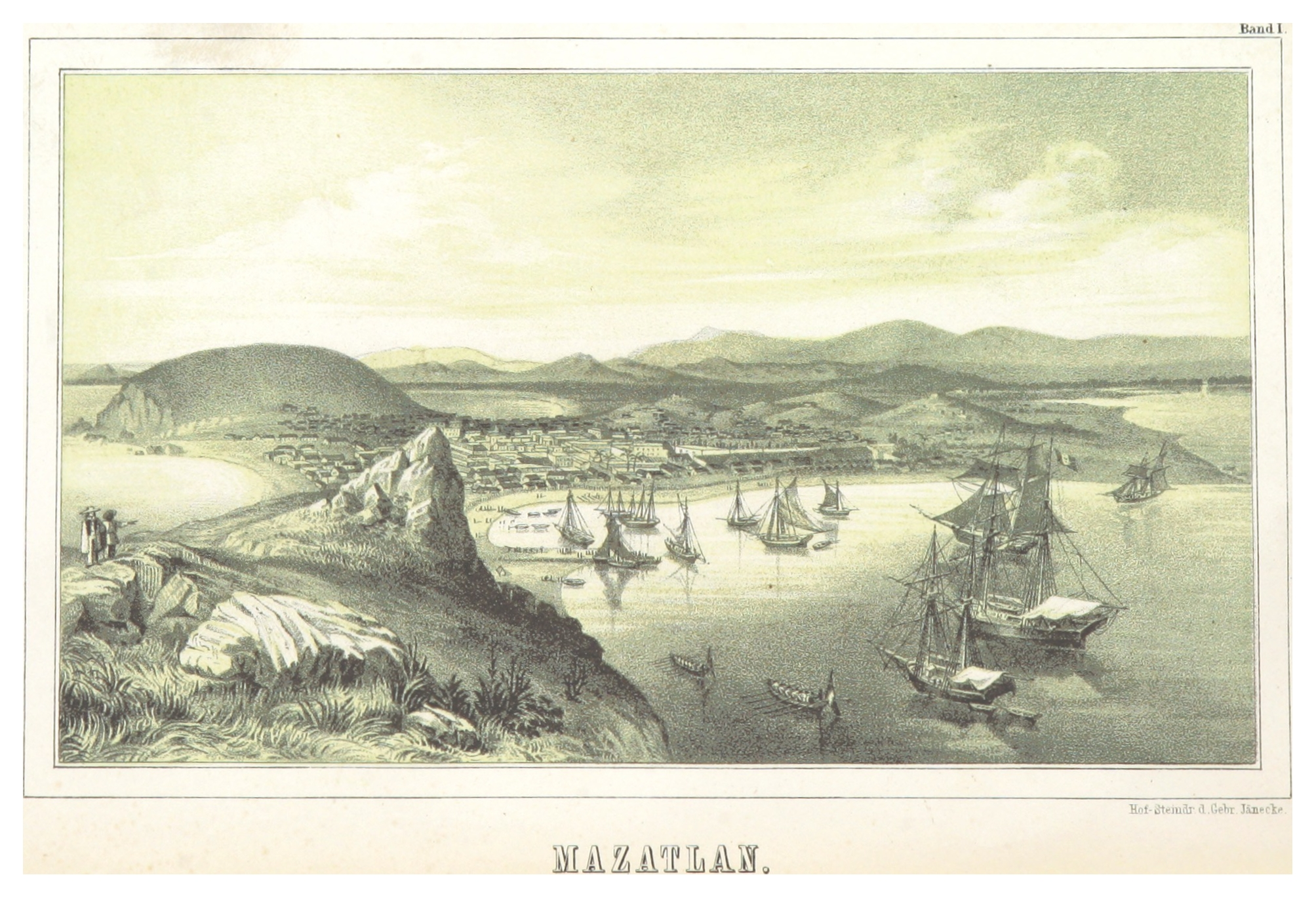
Lithograph of Mazatlán in 1845

Until the early 19th century, Mazatlán was a collection of huts inhabited by indigenous people whose major occupation was fishing, according to Abel Aubert du Petit-Thouars, a French explorer. In 1829, a Filipino banker named Juan Nepomuceno Machado arrived and established commercial relations with vessels coming to Mazatlán from far off places such as Chile, Peru, the United States, Europe, and Asia Pacific. By 1836, the city had a population of between 4,000 and 5,000. It subsequently became the largest port on the Mexican Pacific coast.

In 1846 during the Mexican-American War, Mazatlán was invaded and occupied by the U.S. military as part of the U.S. Pacific Coast campaign. In 1859, the port was blockaded by Captain Sidney Grenfell of the British warship H.M.S. Amethyst. On November 13, 1864, the French Army and the Imperialist forces took possession of Mazatlán, until they were deported on November 13, 1866, by General Ramón Corona's forces. After customs officials seized twenty-three ounces of gold from the British warship Chanticleer on June 18, 1868, which at the time was blockading the port, its captain, William H. Bridge, threatened to bomb the city on November 22.

During the California Gold Rush, fortune hunters from the United States' East Coast sailed from New York Harbor and other Atlantic ports to Mexican ports in the Gulf of Mexico. After landing, the aspiring miners travelled over land for weeks to Mazatlán, where they would embark from the port to arrive in San Francisco in another four to five weeks.

When Félix Zuloaga Tacubaya proclaimed the Plan of Ignoring the Constitution of 1857, the garrison of the Plaza de Mazatlán did not remain outside this proclamation, and on January 1, 1858, the Plan of Mazatlán was proclaimed, which followed Zuloaga's Plan.

The capital of Sinaloa, until the year 1853, had been Culiacán. However, that year, the capital was transferred to Mazatlán. On July 22, 1867, the federal government passed a law that forbade state capitals from also acting as ports. As a result of this law, on September 20, 1873, the State Legislature decreed that Culiacán would be the state capital again.

The Siglo XIX constitution of 1852 decreed a new internal division in Sinaloa, which reduced it to nine districts by removing San Ignacio, which had been annexed to the Cosalá, and Choix, which had been annexed to El Fuerte. It also amended the name of the district from Villa de la Unión to the port of Mazatlán. That same constitution also decreed the headquarters and council facility policies in each district.

In 1861, the political headquarters were removed and turned into prefectures, and the same year the State Legislature adopted the Act on Municipalities. In 1868, the district had five municipalities in Mazatlán; one in the center and the other four in Villa Unión, Siqueiros, La Noria, and The Milkweed.

On the morning of November 13, 1864, French Navy ships fired twelve cannon shots into the city, causing minor damage to several homes, but not causing any deaths. The attack stopped when the prefect of the city made known to the invaders that the Mexican Army had left the square and the city was formally ceded to the French.

The Mazatlán Times was a weekly published by the American A. D. Jones. The first issue appeared on May 12, 1863. The publisher boasted that his was the only weekly English-language newspaper, not only in Mazatlán and Sinaloa, but throughout Mexico.

In 1873, according to the census of the State, the District of Mazatlán was reduced to three municipalities: Mazatlán, Villa Unión, and La Noria. Siqueiros had been annexed in 1870 to the central municipality, and The Milkweed to La Noria.

=== Porfiriato ===
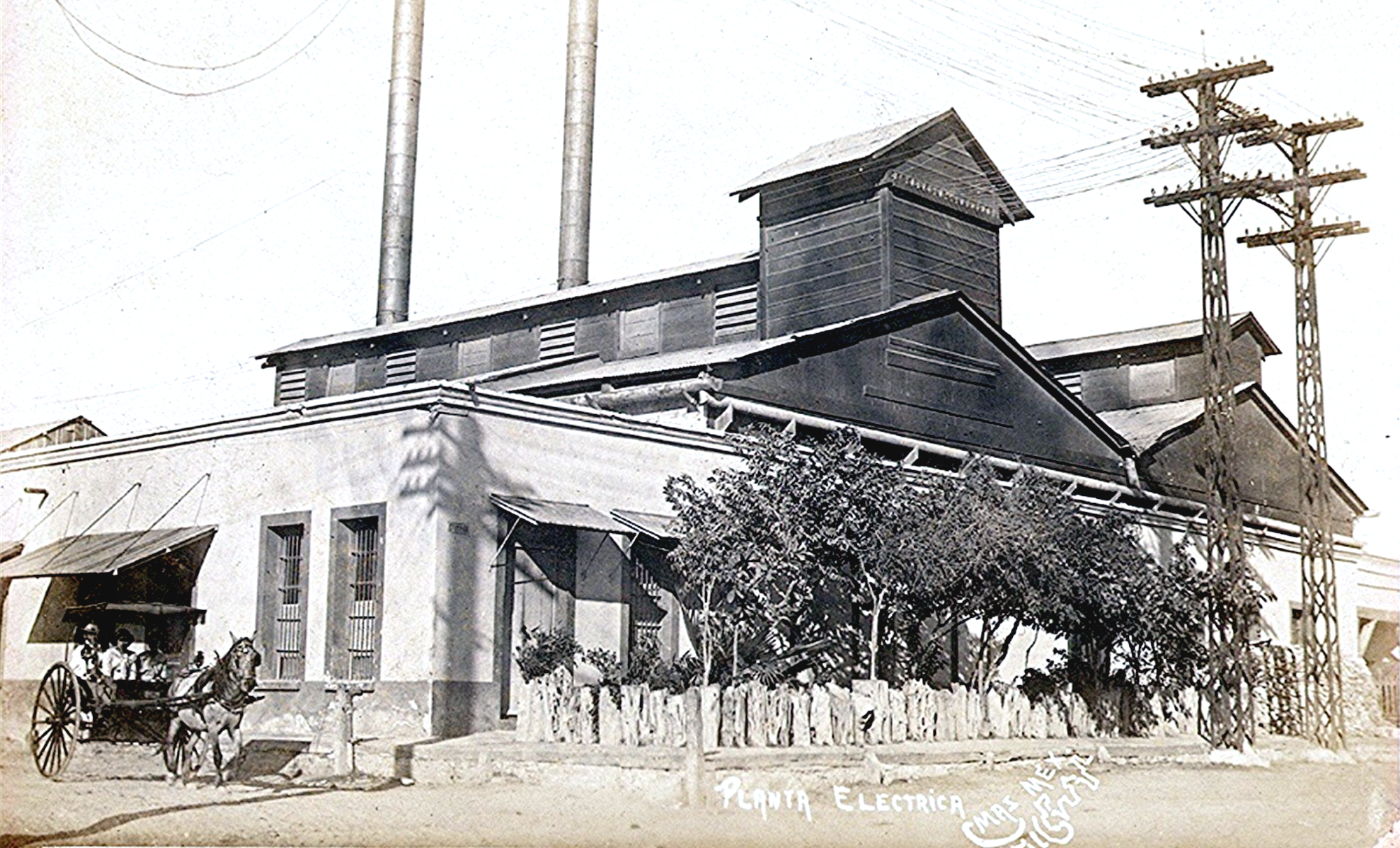
Electricity plant in Mazatlán

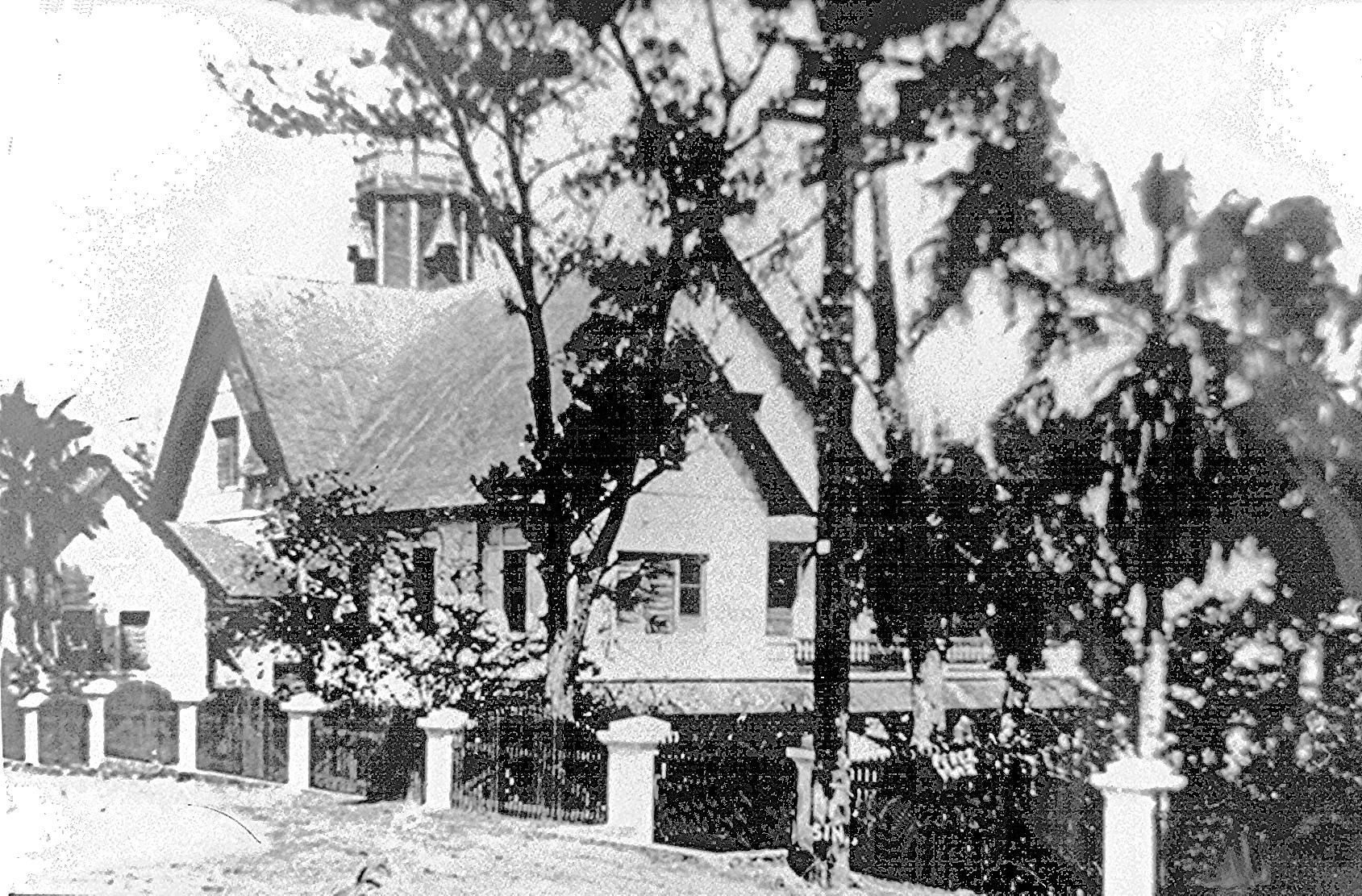
A country house in Mazatlán. During the Porfiriato, wealth and industry arrived to the city.

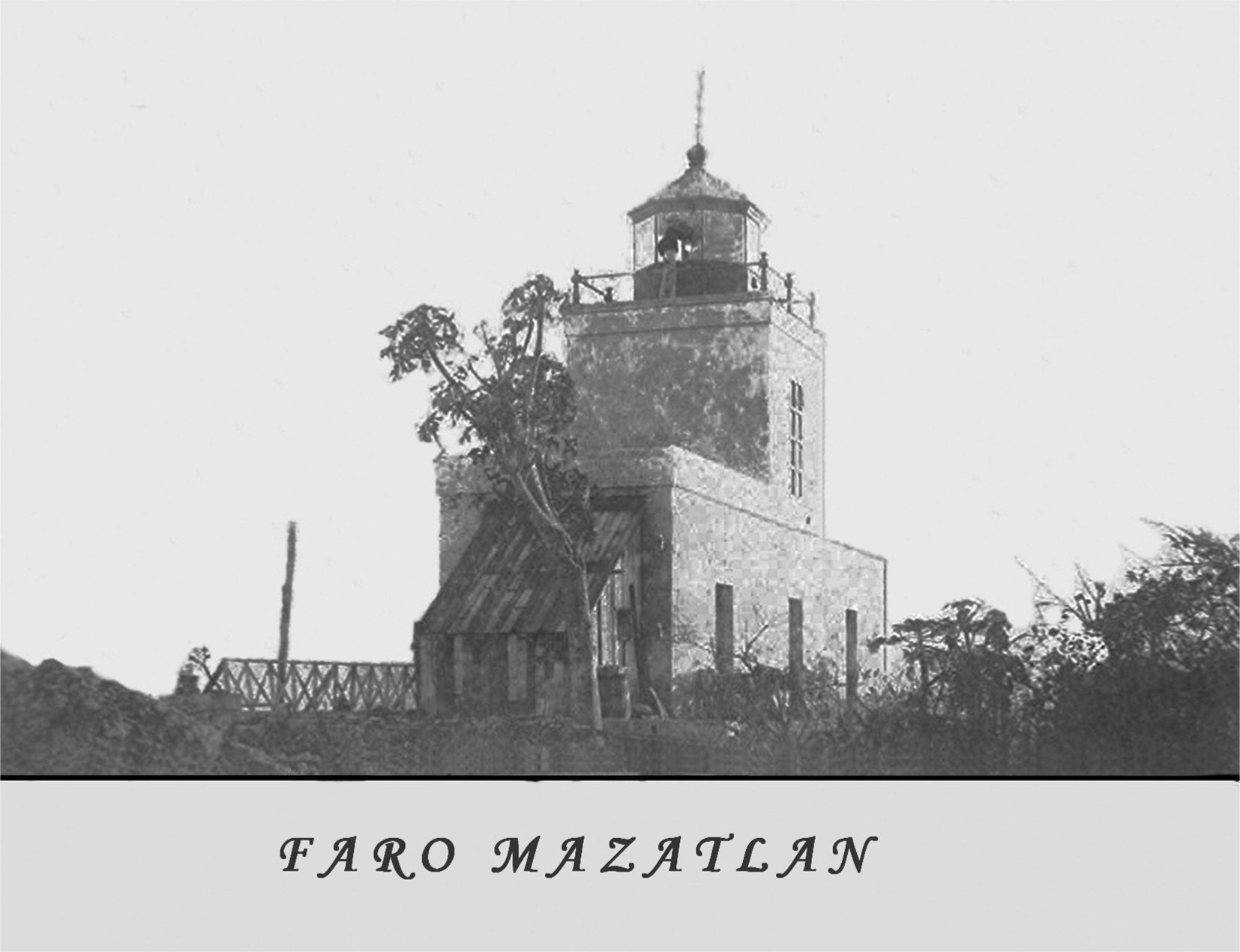
Mazatlán Lighthouse

Mazatlán's lighthouse (El Faro) began operating in mid-1879. The maritime signals were manufactured in Paris, France, containing a large oil lamp with mirrors, and a Fresnel lens to focus the light. Since the light was static, from a distance it was often mistaken for a star. By 1905, this lamp was converted to a revolving lamp. During that period, the Mazatlán lighthouse was considered to be the naturally highest in the world. Today, the 1000 watt bulb can be seen for 30 nautical miles (60 km). Near the lighthouse shore, famous "divers" (called this even by the Spanish-speaking inhabitants of Mazatlán) perform daring jumps off high rocks into the Pacific Ocean, for tips from onlooking tourists.

On June 26, 1880, Jesus Ramirez, former general in command of 400 men, stormed the garrison of the square and appropriated Mazatlán. The city was subsequently bombed again by the Mexican warship the Democratic, which, during its attack, killed and wounded a high number of women and children. Of the 24 cannon shots fired, only three hit the army headquarters, and the rest landed on neighboring houses.

Angela Peralta (1845–1883), a Mexican opera diva famed throughout the world, died of yellow fever in Mazatlán shortly after her arrival in the port. Legend has it that she sang one last aria from her hotel balcony overlooking the Plazuela Machado. Her memory is held dear by Mazatlecos to this day, and the restored Angela Peralta Theater by the Plazuela keeps her memory alive.

The Cerveceria del Pacífico was founded in the city in 1900 by German immigrants.

=== Mexican Revolution ===
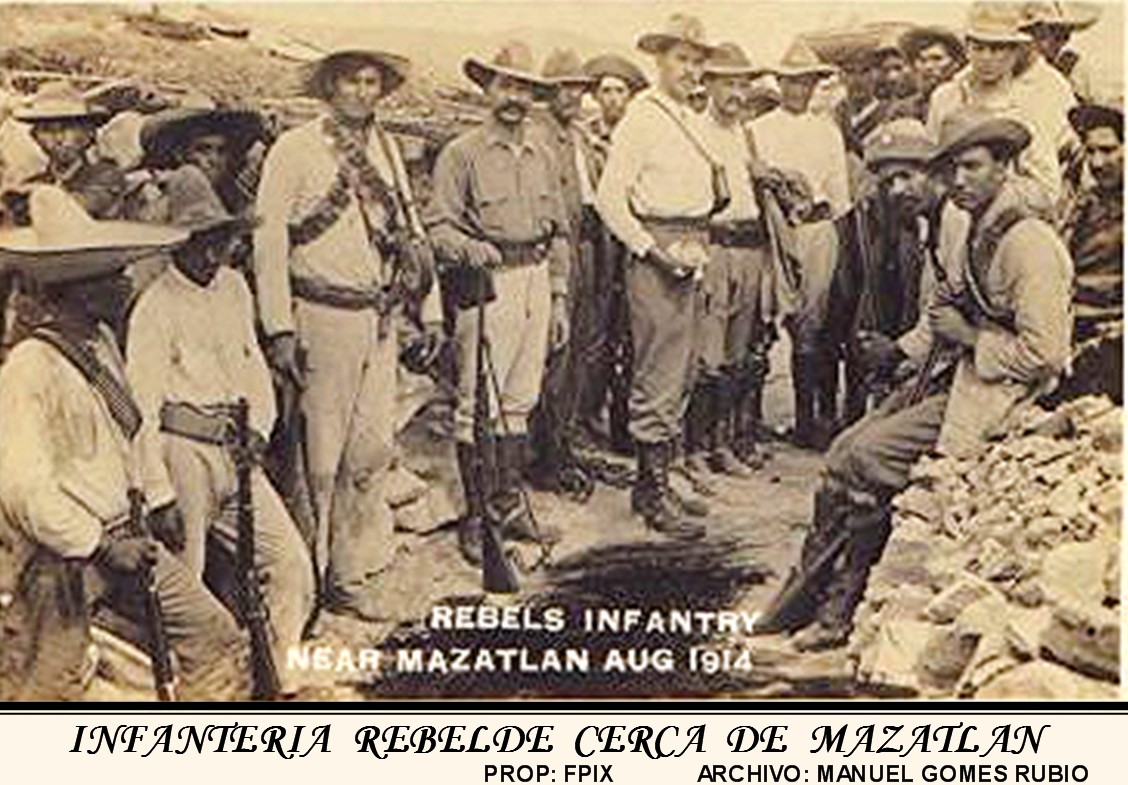
Rebel Infantry near Mazatlán, 1914

In 1912, the municipalities enacted law No.21 as a form of internal division of the State. However, it wasn't until 1915 that the law was abolished by the political directorate, when it erected the first free communes.

With the publication of the decree creating the municipality of Mazatlán in the official newspaper on April 8, 1915, independent life began in the region. The Constitution of 1917, culminating in the first constitutional governor, General Ramón F. Iturbe, born in Mazatlán, confirmed the sixteen municipalities into which the state was divided, which would then be subdivided into receiverships and police precincts.

The City of Mazatlán has the dubious distinction of being the second city in the world after Tripoli, Libya, to suffer aerial bombardment (although the local historical display at the plazuela claims that Mazatlán was the first). During the Mexican Revolution, General Venustiano Carranza (later president), intent on taking the city of Mazatlán, ordered a biplane to drop a crude bomb of nails and dynamite wrapped in leather on the target of Neveria Hill adjacent to the downtown area of Mazatlán. The crude bomb landed off target on the city streets of Mazatlán, killing two citizens and wounding several others.

=== Modern ===
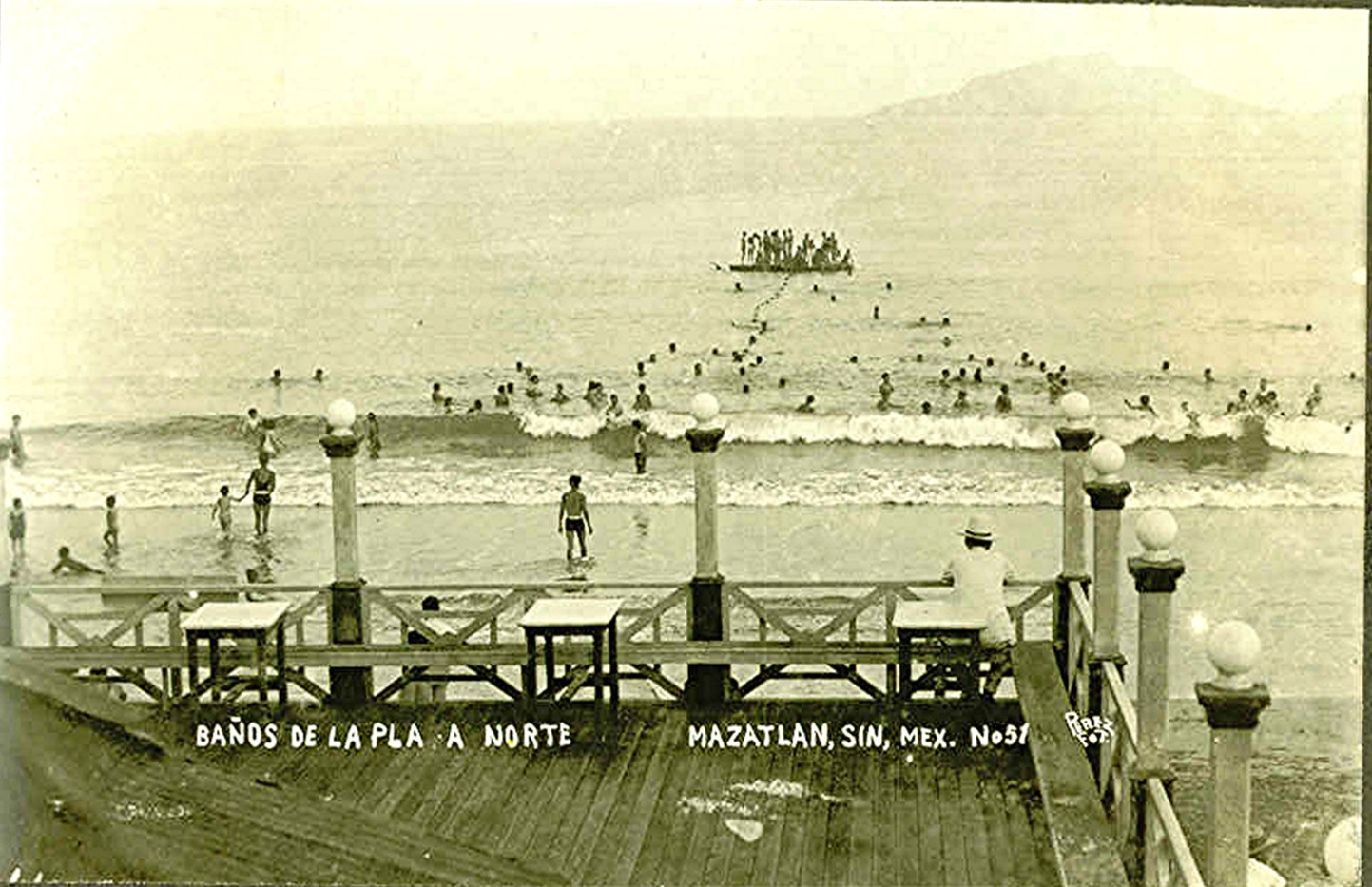
Beachgoers

Mazatlán is also the hometown of Pedro Infante, one of the most popular actors and singers of the Cinema of Mexico's golden years.

Mazatlán was well regarded by film stars such as John Wayne, Gary Cooper, John Huston, and others of their generation as a sportfishing mecca. The hotels along Olas Altas flourished during the 1940s, 1950s and 1960s, supporting this vibrant trade.

In the 1970s, tourism in Old Mazatlán declined as newer venues catering to Western tourists opened on the expanses of beach to the north of the city ("Zona Dorada"). As an example of Mazatlán's tourism expansion, one of the largest timeshare providers in Mexico, Grupo Vidanta, was founded in 1975 with the inauguration of Paraíso Mazatlán (Mazatlán Paradise). This time also saw the expansion of the Hotel Playa Mazatlán, and the construction of many others, a trend that continues to this day.

Next to Infante, Lorena Herrera, one of the most famous actresses and singers in Mexico and Latin America during the final decades of the 20th century and the first decades of the 21st century, is Mazatlán's most famous native. German-born telenovela star Sabine Moussier, a stablemate of Herrera's—both have been under Televisa contract since the 1990s—also grew up in Mazatlán. Hollywood and Broadway actress Sara Ramirez is also a Mazatlán native.

Ten Minute Time Lapse Video of the Total Solar Eclipse on April 8, 2024, in Mazatlán, Mexico.

As the 21st century began, the Centro Histórico was rediscovered by newcomers and locals alike, spurring a renaissance of restoration and entrepreneurial endeavors. Once-fine homes that had fallen into literal ruin were restored to their former glory as family homes and boutique businesses. The city has assisted by upgrading infrastructure such as better water, sewer, and electrical services.

Mazatlán experienced two total solar eclipses in relatively rapid succession on July 11, 1991 and April 8, 2024, and it was the first city in North America to experience the latter eclipse.

In 2026 amidst the Mexican drug war 3 were killed here in a shootout.

== Neighboring communities ==
The town of Mazatlán is organized territorially into nine syndicates:

Mazatlán: Municipal capital, largest and most important tourist destination.

Villa Union: Located 25 km from Mazatlán, second most important town of the municipality. It is said that the first settlers belonged to a Spanish family who arrived there in 1576. Among its economic activities are fishing, agriculture, livestock, fruit growing, aquaculture, and brick making.

El Recodo: So-called for the square shape of the Rio Presidio at this point. It is the cradle of Don Cruz Lizarraga, founder of the international Banda El Recodo. Its economic activities are livestock, agriculture, fruit growing, tanning, and saddlery.

El Quelite: A picturesque and attractive tourist town located 38 km northwest of Mazatlán. The El Quelite River passes through it. Its houses contain the Spanish classical influence predominant in the eighteenth century. Charrería is practiced here, as is the Prehispanic game called Ulama. The main economic activities are: livestock, agriculture, farming and fruit growing.

Mármol de Salcido: This town is 32 km from Mazatlán. It was an important cement and line production center. Its current economic activity is the production of chilies, fodder, and tomatoes; its coast has a large number of pristine beaches.

El Roble: Founded in 1867, it is 32 km from Mazatlán. It became the largest sugar mill in the south of the state. Its main economic activities are agriculture and the production of cheese and honey.

Siqueiros: Originally called Penitas, it then adopted the name of San José de Siqueiros, in honor of the patron saint of the town, and the name of its founder. Founded in 1749, it is located 29 km from Mazatlán on the Presidio River. Among its economic activities are agriculture, livestock, and vegetables.

La Noria: Located 35 km northwest of Mazatlán, its first settlers date from the late sixteenth century. Among its economic activities are livestock, agriculture, and saddlery. It is close to Presa Picachos. A few miles away is the famous Vinata de Los Osuna, a major producer of blue agave, belonging to the family of the same name.

El Habal: A village located 10 km north of Mazatlán. Its inhabitants are engaged in animal husbandry, farming, and fruit growing.

== Geography ==
Mazatlán in Sinaloa

The town of Mazatlán is located in the southern Sinaloa. With a land area of 3,068.5 square kilometres (1,184.8 sq mi) (5.3% of the total area of the state), it is Sinaloa's ninth largest municipality. It is bordered on the north by the municipality of San Ignacio and the state of Durango, on the south by the town of El Rosario and the Pacific Ocean, on the east by the town of Concordia, and on the west by the Pacific Ocean.

Its average elevation is 10 metres (33 ft) above sea level.

=== Geomorphology ===
The orography is determined by the ramifications of the Sierra Madre Occidental on the northwestern coastal plain bearing towards the Pacific Ocean, where the hills rise towards Vigia, Punta de Materén, and the Monte chair. This orography, before entering the municipality of San Ignacio, takes the name of Sierra del Metate, whose characteristic is the formation of Peak Metate.

At the edge of Mazatlán and Concordia runs the Sierra del Metate and Panuco. In this county, the Sierra Madre Occidental is diverted to penetrate Durango, leaving before some detachments, such as the Sierra de San Juan and the Friars, and constitutes, in of its topography, the following hilly areas:

To the north end of town one can see the Friars extending northwest, with elevations ranging from 150 to 1,900 meters above sea level. In the northwestern portion, El Quelite branches have elevations of 50–700 meters above sea level. On the south-east and north sides, Arroyo de La Noria and some tributaries of the River El Quelite rise. The town of La Noria is located in this same part of the mountain, extending in a northwesterly direction at 300 and 500 meters above sea level. On its western side, the Zapote Brook begins. The Sierra de San Marcos is located in the north at 50 to 700 meters above sea level. Forming the southeastern and northwestern slopes are Brook Copala and some tributaries of the Presidio River.

=== Geology ===
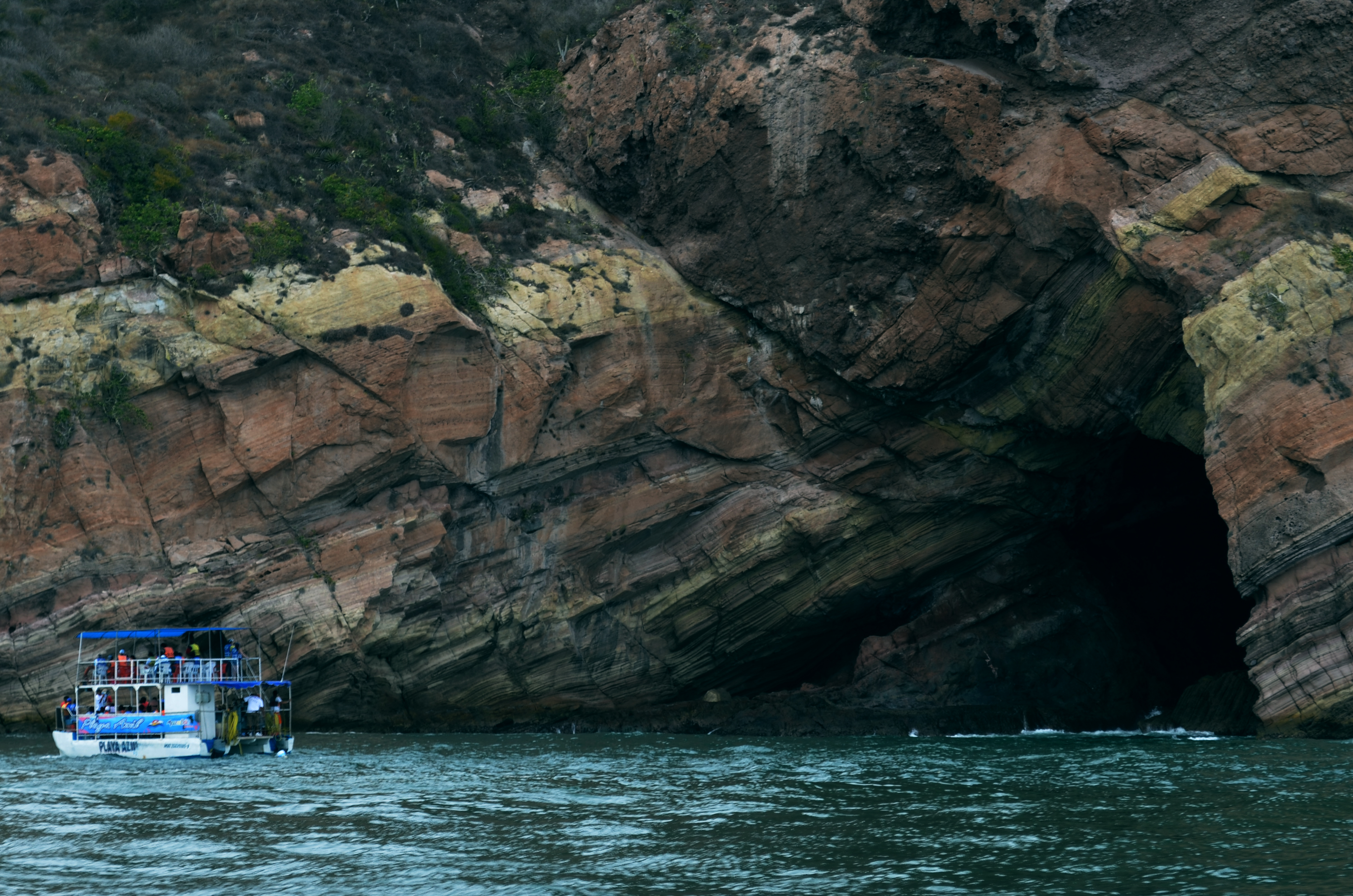
Yacht tour, Mazatlán, Sinaloa

The geological nature of the municipality, primarily made of sedimentary rock, gives rise to the outcrop of fragments of marine and consolidated rocks, and volcanic and metamorphic rocks. Mazatlán generally consists of tonalite and monsonitas belonging to the Middle Tertiary: rhyodacites, rhyolites and ignimbrites with tuffaceous sediments at the base outcrops; andesitic rocks and felsitic late Early Cretaceous conglomerate, sandstone, tuff, sandy tuff "tobalítica", conglomeratic sandstone, arkose storm origins and late Tertiary rhyolitic tuffs, limestones, shales, sandstones and quartzites of coal, gravel and conglomerates that make alluvial fans and slope deposits; rhyolite and rhyodacite tuffs of the same composition, dacite and Lower Tertiary andecita medium; volcanic and pyroclastic spills of andecitic Cretaceous composition; plutonic rocks of basic composition and basic ultra late Paleozoic, Cretaceous limestones, conglomerates of igneous and metamorphic songs; sediments within the course of rivers and streams and sandy sediments, gravel, silt, and orange.

=== Hydrology ===
El Quelite River, and the Zapote, La Noria, and Los Cocos streams form part of the water resources of the municipality in the southwestern and southeastern slopes; these streams increase its volume considerably during the rainy season.

The current of the El Quelite River recorded a catchment of 835 square kilometers, where it drained annually for an average of 107 million cubic meters with variations ranging from 78 to 163 million cubic meters. This hydrological current passing through the town of Mazatlán touches the towns of El Castillo, Las Juntas, Amapa, Los Naranjos, Milkweed, Modesto Station, and El Recreo. After traveling a distance of 100 kilometers from its source, it discharges into the Pacific Ocean. The El Zapote and Los Cocos streams drain in a southeasterly direction to end at the Presidio River, up to the villages from which they take their names.

On the southeast slope of the Sierra del Quelite is the De La Noria stream, and on the north side of it are some tributaries from the El Quelite River. The La Noria stream drains in a southeasterly direction of the town of the same name, and finally ends in the Presidio River.

El Zapote stream is formed on the western slope of the Sierra de La Noria, and moves in a southwesterly direction. In passing, it touches the towns of Zapote and El Recreo, and empties into the Pacific Ocean.

On the northern slopes of the Sierra del Salto, near the village of the same name in the state of Durango, the Presidio River moves southeastward and makes a journey of 167 kilometers. Its catchment area is 5,614 square kilometers, with an average annual expenditure of 900 million cubic meters, a maximum of 2,225 and a minimum of 550 million cubic meters. Populations on its banks are Los Cocos, El Zapote, El Placer, El Tecomate, Copala, El Recodo, Porras, Villa Unión, Alley Ostial, and Alley Rosa.

=== Coast ===
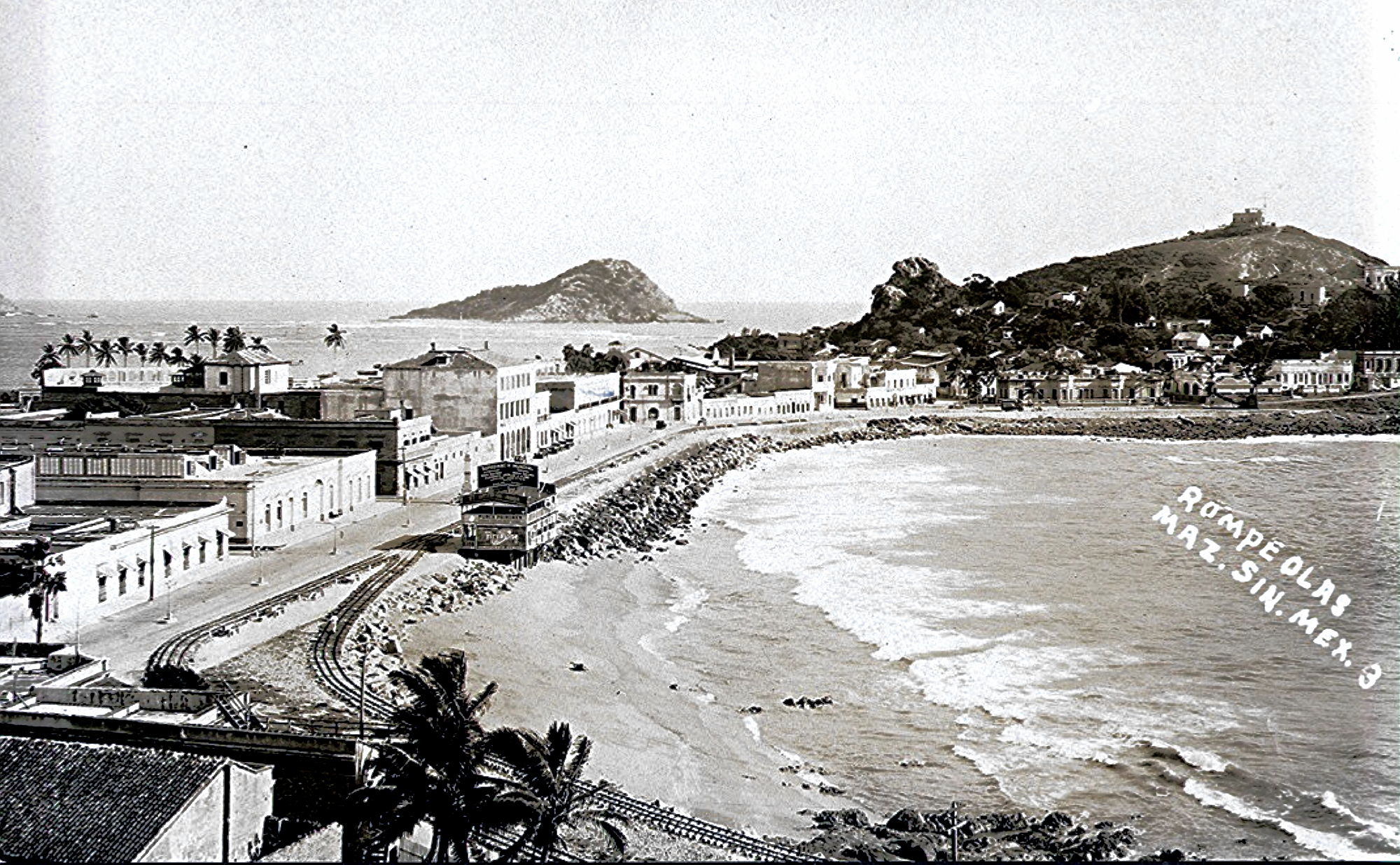
Old photograph of Mazatlán showing a breakwater

The coasts of the municipality extend over 80 kilometres (50 mi), and sandy beach sediments are formed in the northwestern flank of the head of the municipality. There is a substance classified as berms, which is a soft sediment formation. The coast consists of gravel and conglomerates that form alluvial fans and slope deposits.

In the southwestern corner, Huizache Lagoon occupies an area of 4,000 hectares (40.0 square miles). It receives the maritime influence through the Ostial estuary and freshwater diversion channel, and receives water from the Presidio River.

The coastline of the municipality is lined with shrimp and small-scale flake fishing vessels.

Cooperatives are distributed in the estuaries of the Escopama, Salinitas, El Veintinueve, and Estero Uriah Huizache lagoon.

Most of the islands of the municipality are formed by ignimbrites, rhyolitic tuffs and tuffaceous sandstones of altered and deformed light color.

Bird Island is located between the extreme equatorial coordinates of 106 ° 28'34 " west longitude and 23 ° 15'25" north latitude; its area is about 0.4 square kilometers, 1.1 kilometers long, and maximum and minimum range of 800–650 meters respectively.

Deer Island is located between 106 ° 27'60 " west longitude and 23 ° 14'03" north latitude; its approximate length is 1.850 meters (6 ft 0.8 in), and its width varies between 250 and 700 meters (820 and 2,300 ft).

Crestón Island is located on the western edge of the outer bay of Mazatlán, and it has a length of 700 meters and a maximum width of 800 meters. To the northwest, about 3 miles away, small islands like "Southern Brother" and "Northern Brother" (the first with 46.3 meters in elevation) and Turtle Rock rise 1.5 meters above sea level at its highest ridge.

Goats Island is similar to Crestón's appearance; it has a height above sea level of a little over 50 meters.

Stone Island is the most important part of the municipal coastline; its size is the largest of all because it has 30 square kilometers, and is approximately 14.5 miles long by 2.5 wide. Despite its name, Stone Island is a peninsula that connects to the continent near the Mazatlán International Airport.

=== Climate ===
Located just south of the Tropic of Cancer, Mazatlán has a tropical savanna climate (Aw), bordering a hot semi-arid climate (BSh), with a marked and rather long dry season and an average annual temperature of 25 °C.

Mazatlán sunset

During the summer months, with the humidity factor, temperatures usually feel well above what the thermometer shows.

During the period of 1940–1980, the municipality experienced an average annual 748 mm of precipitation, with a maximum of 215.4 mm in 24 hours, and 90.4 mm was observed in one hour. During the same period the average evaporation rate per year was 2146.80 mm; the prevailing winds are in a northwesterly direction at an average speed of 5.0 meters.

Climate data for Mazatlán (1981–2000)
Month	Jan	Feb	Mar	Apr	May	Jun	Jul	Aug	Sep	Oct	Nov	Dec	Year
Record high °C (°F)	33.0 (91.4)	35.7 (96.3)	33.0 (91.4)	38.9 (102.0)	33.8 (92.8)	38.1 (100.6)	37.0 (98.6)	36.0 (96.8)	39.0 (102.2)	35.4 (95.7)	35.1 (95.2)	31.4 (88.5)	39.0 (102.2)
Mean daily maximum °C (°F)	25.4 (77.7)	25.7 (78.3)	26.2 (79.2)	27.8 (82.0)	29.5 (85.1)	32.1 (89.8)	32.8 (91.0)	32.9 (91.2)	32.7 (90.9)	32.2 (90.0)	29.5 (85.1)	26.8 (80.2)	29.5 (85.0)
Daily mean °C (°F)	20.1 (68.2)	20.4 (68.7)	21.1 (70.0)	22.9 (73.2)	25.4 (77.7)	28.6 (83.5)	29.1 (84.4)	29.1 (84.4)	29.0 (84.2)	27.9 (82.2)	24.5 (76.1)	21.8 (71.2)	25.0 (77.0)
Mean daily minimum °C (°F)	14.9 (58.8)	15.1 (59.2)	16.0 (60.8)	18.1 (64.6)	21.3 (70.3)	25.0 (77.0)	25.5 (77.9)	25.3 (77.5)	25.2 (77.4)	23.6 (74.5)	19.4 (66.9)	16.7 (62.1)	20.5 (68.9)
Record low °C (°F)	7.5 (45.5)	9.5 (49.1)	10.4 (50.7)	7.9 (46.2)	12.8 (55.0)	19.0 (66.2)	20.4 (68.7)	14.9 (58.8)	20.3 (68.5)	17.8 (64.0)	12.0 (53.6)	9.3 (48.7)	7.5 (45.5)
Average precipitation mm (inches)	41.9 (1.65)	8.8 (0.35)	2.4 (0.09)	5.2 (0.20)	1.9 (0.07)	20.6 (0.81)	175.8 (6.92)	230.6 (9.08)	174.1 (6.85)	66.5 (2.62)	46.6 (1.83)	25.9 (1.02)	800.3 (31.49)
Average precipitation days (≥ 0.1 mm)	2.3	1.0	0.5	0.6	0.1	2.0	10.2	11.0	10.5	3.5	2.1	2.2	46
Average relative humidity (%)	64	61	57	54	55	60	70	80	82	69	65	67	65
Mean monthly sunshine hours	215.6	224.8	257.3	255.1	297.0	271.5	223.4	233.6	215.3	248.0	241.5	205.7	2,888.8
Source 1: SMN
Source 2: NOAA (sun 1961–1990)

=== Flora and fauna ===
Whale watching in Mazatlán

The flora of Mazatlán are tabachines, eucalyptus, laurels, and poplars. Its fauna includes birds like ducks, herons, and pelicans. There are armadillos, raccoons, and a variety of marine species such as whales, dolphins, turtles, and fish. White-tailed deer is one of the main animals that characterizes Mazatlán. Today, there are fewer animals and plants than before, due to the way humans have changed the ecosystem.

Mazatlán has several protected areas, one of which is the Protection of Flora and Fauna Area (APFF). CACAXTLA Plateau is located between the towns of Mazatlán and San Ignacio in the central part of the state of Sinaloa, and contains a portion of the coastal habitats of the state, and is the largest in Sinaloa. This wealth of habitats favors the presence of 66 species of flora and fauna listed in NOM-059-ECOL-2001 and CITES and 47.5% of endemism reported for Sinaloa, plus charismatic and commercially important species. At the same time, the protected area is home to a population of 7,964 inhabitants, whose livelihood depends entirely on the extraction of natural resources in this area. The relationship between nature and society in the APFF Cacaxtla Plateau is the focus of this program.

== Economy ==
Tourism and fishing are the main industries in Mazatlán. The city houses the main beach resorts, and has the second largest fishing fleet in Mexico. The most processed seafood products in the city are shrimp and tuna. The first Mazatlán hotel with a restaurant inside was named Canton La Fonda, and became operational in 1850. It was owned by a Chinese immigrant, Luen-Sing, which called the establishment the Luen-Sing Hotel. In 1864, there were three hotels and three restaurants in Mazatlán, with more opening in the late nineteenth century. Today, more than twenty miles of beaches are the main attraction, and the city contains a large number of hotels, restaurants, bars, and shops. The city is also home to the Pacífico brewery, a coffee factory, and two power plants.

Kitesurfing in Mazatlán

Flyboard in Mazatlán

== Main beaches ==
- Olas Altas: the beach with greatest historical reference to Mazatlán, it is located in the southern part of the city, a few meters from downtown. It has a length of 550 meters, in the section of the boardwalk that passes through Olas Altas one can see various monuments such as The Shield, which contains the shields of Sinaloa and Mazatlán; The Deer, a statue of a deer representing the etymology of the city's name; Monument to Pedro Infante; Monument to the Continuity of Life; Monument to Mazatleca Women, and also the restaurant "Puerto Viejo".
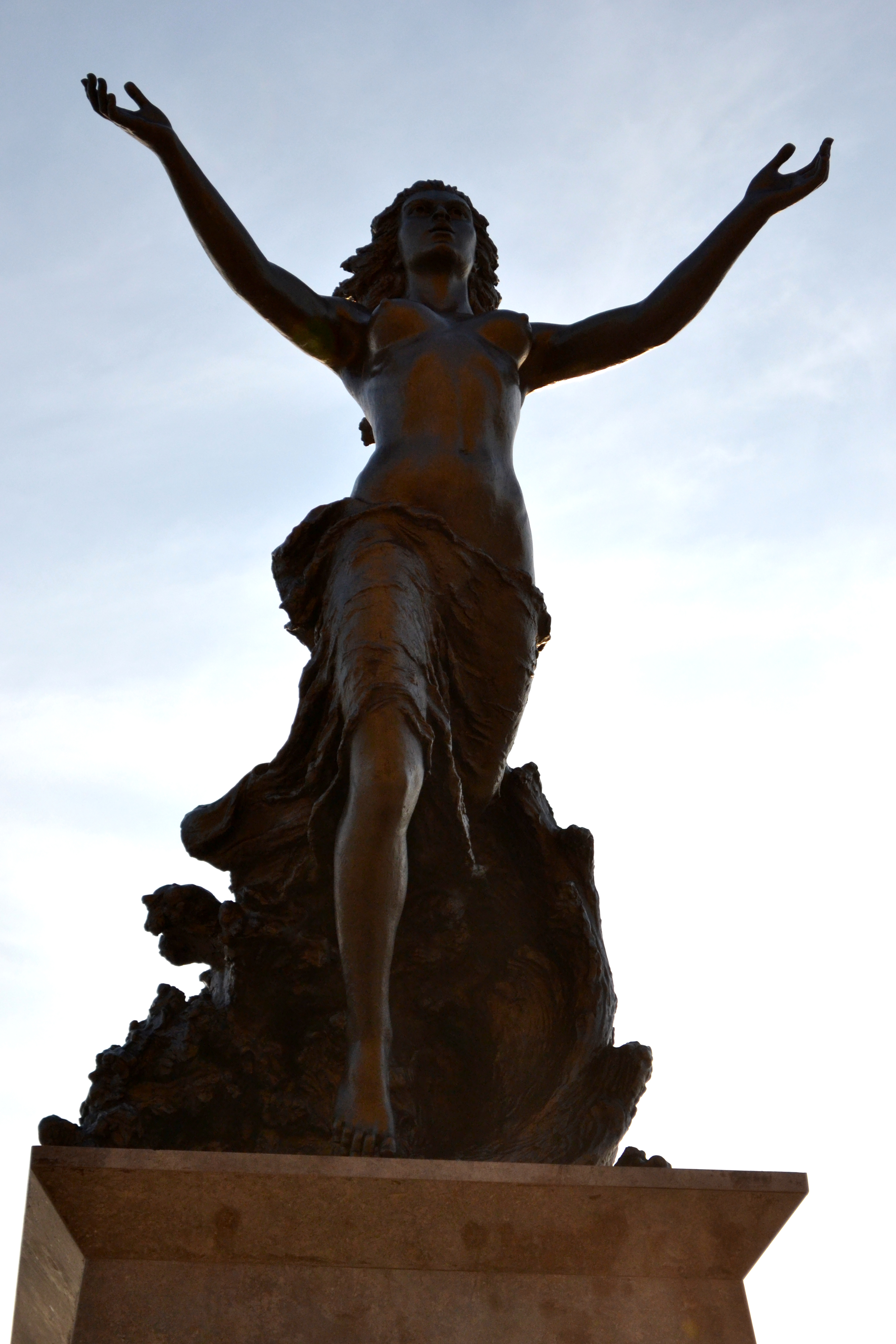
Monument to Mazatleca women

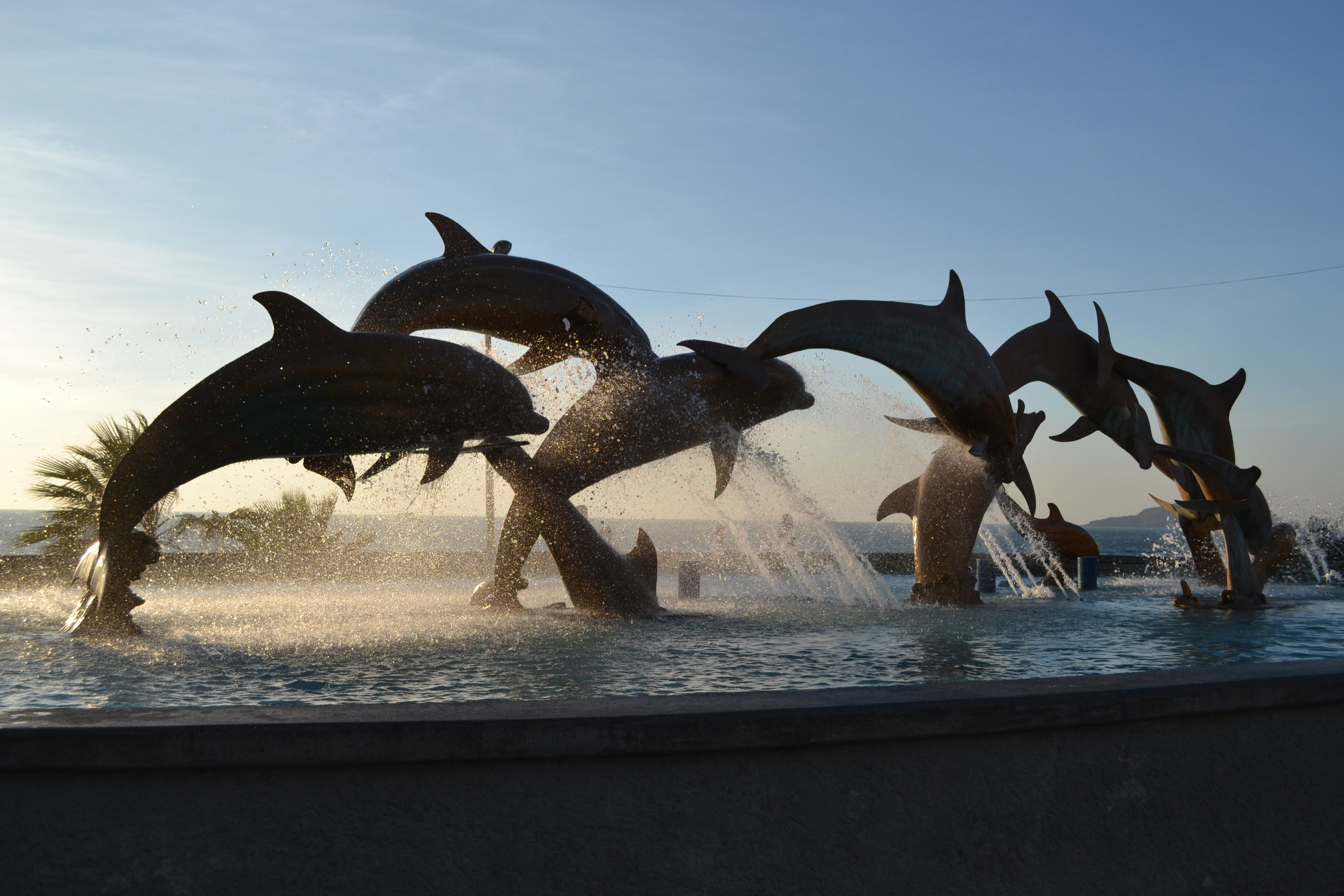
Monument to the Continuity of Life

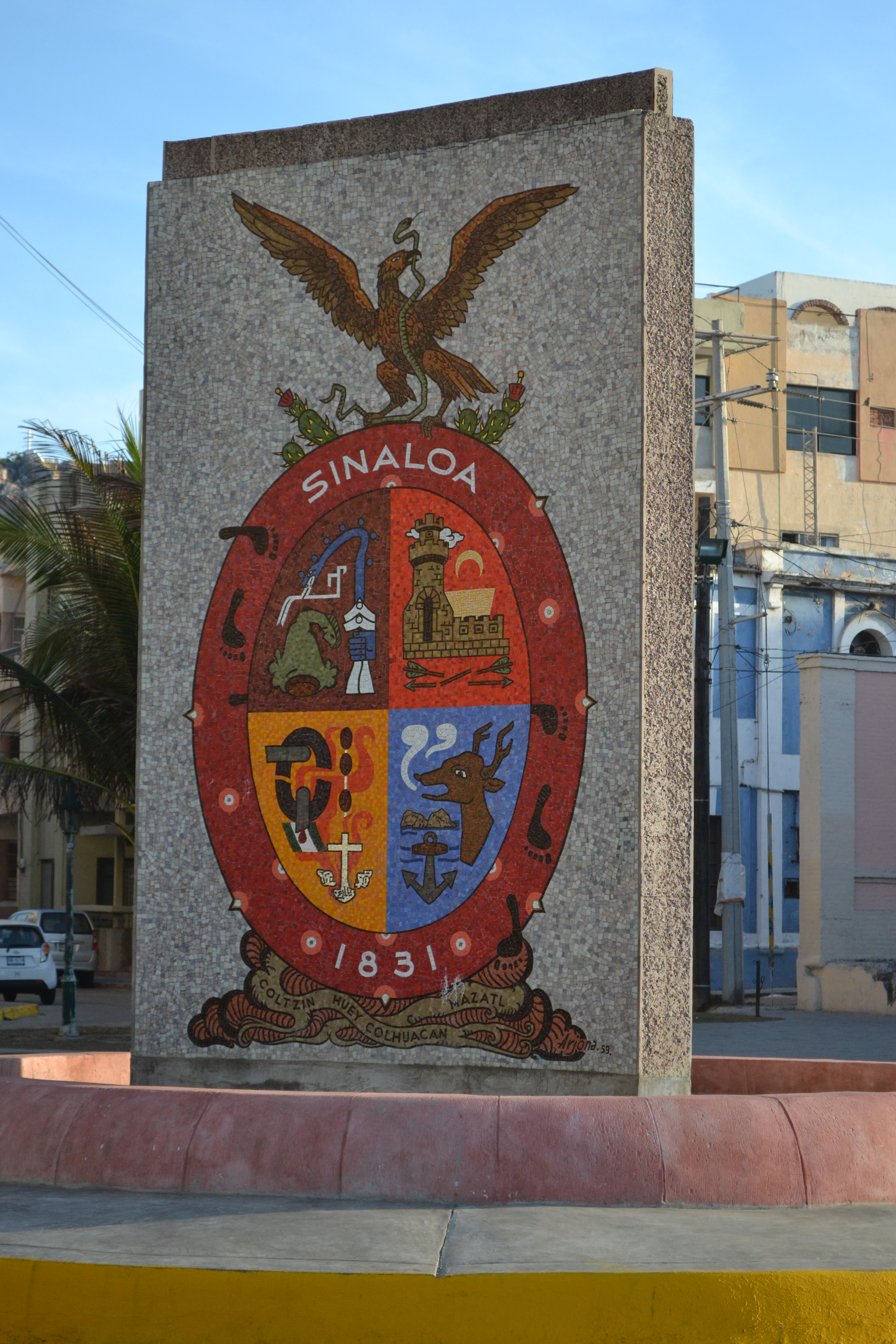
Coat of Sinaloa in Olas Altas

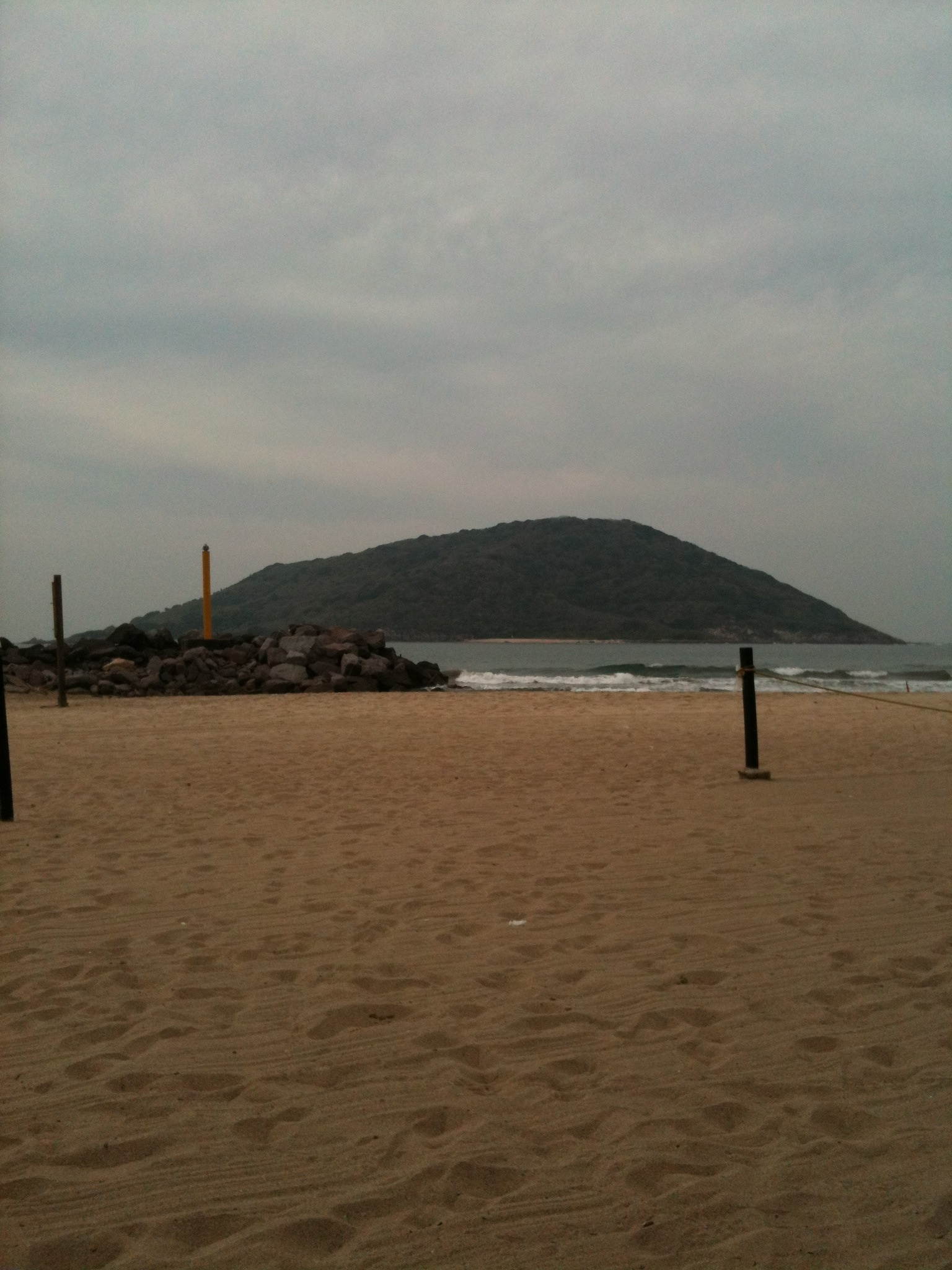
Playa Sábalo
- Norte Beach: It is located along the northwest edge of the commercial downtown district. Here one can find the Monument to Fishermen; the Monument to Pulmonias, and the Monument to the hometown Pacific Brewery. The second of these refers to the characteristic taxis of this city.
- Sábalo Beach: the long stretch of beach along Camaron Sabalo and Malecon from the Fishermen's Monument to the marina jetty.
- Cerritos Beach: It starts at the entrance to the "new" marina and the end of the Golden Zone (hotel district) and runs north to Cerritos point, a rocky landform just before the Emerald Bay resort.
- Isla de la Piedra Beach: A miles-long Located in the southern part of the city on the peninsula that is separated from the old city by the entrance to the main commercial harbor; only accessible by car on a recently paved road from just off the airport access road, or, by small passenger ferries that provide regular service from the docks at the edge of the historic center.

== Tourism and culture ==
=== Historic Center ===
The Historic Center of Mazatlán, among whose former inhabitants are French, German, Chinese, Italian, Spanish and Americans (many contemporary inhabitants of Mazatlán are descended from these), was named Heritage of the Nation on 12 March 2001. A civil association composed of a group of Mazatlán locals have managed to revive this area, along with the support of various organizations, companies, and government authorities. Among the buildings and areas of high cultural value are the Cathedral, Plazuela República, Plazuela Zaragoza, Plazuela Machado, Plazuela Hidalgo, the Angela Peralta Theater, the old Hotel Iturbide (today the Municipal Arts Centre), Mansion of Redo, Melchers House, House of Retes, Corvera Building, Bank of London and Mexico Building, Haas House, Temple of San José, and various others.

=== Culture and art ===
Mazatlán hosts several events annually, the most important being the International Carnival of Mazatlán, which was 114 years old in 2012. Other important events are the Mazatlán Cultural Festival and the José Limón International Dance Festival, celebrated every year in the winter and spring, respectively. There is also the Book Fair and Arts of Mazatlán (Feliart) and Mazatlán Book Fair (FELIMAZ).

Another important event is the International Motorcycle Week, which attracts thousands of motorcyclists from around the country as well as from abroad, and is held each year during Easter week.

In sports, Mazatlán is home to the Pacific International Triathlon held in April, and the Pacific International Marathon, which is held every year in late November and early December, and is attended by athletes from around the world.

In 2012, Mazatlán was chosen as the host city for the tenth installment of Premios Oye!, prizes awarded by the National Academy of Music in Mexico, and the Volleyball Olympic qualifiers for the Olympic Games in London 2012.

=== Mazatlán Carnival ===
Naval Combat in Mazatlán

This is currently one of the most important carnivals in Mexico, since the first parade on Sunday brings together more than 600,000 people for over three hours in the coastal area of the city on the "Avenida del Mar." A novelty that allows tourists to come from all over the world to witness this festival is called "Burning of humor" where tradition says to burn a character (Monigote) representing someone who people think has done a misdeed, which usually means politicians, presidents, or as in 2013, "influenza" was burned. Both of these have negatively affected the country's image in recent years. This is followed by the famous "Naval Combat," depicting the battle that took place against French vessels seeking to land at the port.

A representative element of this carnival are "Monigotes" that are placed in important areas of the city as decorations. These are large figures made of paper mache and supported by large structures. The central events of the carnival are the crowning of the queen of the carnival, a massive event held with a selection of artists. Two parades are scheduled, one on Sunday and another on Mardi Gras (to close the celebration). Decorated floats line much of the coastal walk, with an estimated several hundred thousand spectators in attendance. These include royal courts, ambassadors from around the country and abroad, special guests such as athletes, TV entertainers, and various show-business personalities, as well as hundreds of Mazatlecos of all ages and social conditions.

The Mazatlán Carnival is distinguished from other carnivals for its distinctive accompaniment by Banda Sinaloa music that has transcended the world through what is today called "la onda grupera." Events includes cultural activities (poetry contests, literature prizes, and shows of enormous artistic quality), with which the party extends to all sectors of the population and covers a range of local and tourist tastes.

=== Mazatlán Lighthouse ===
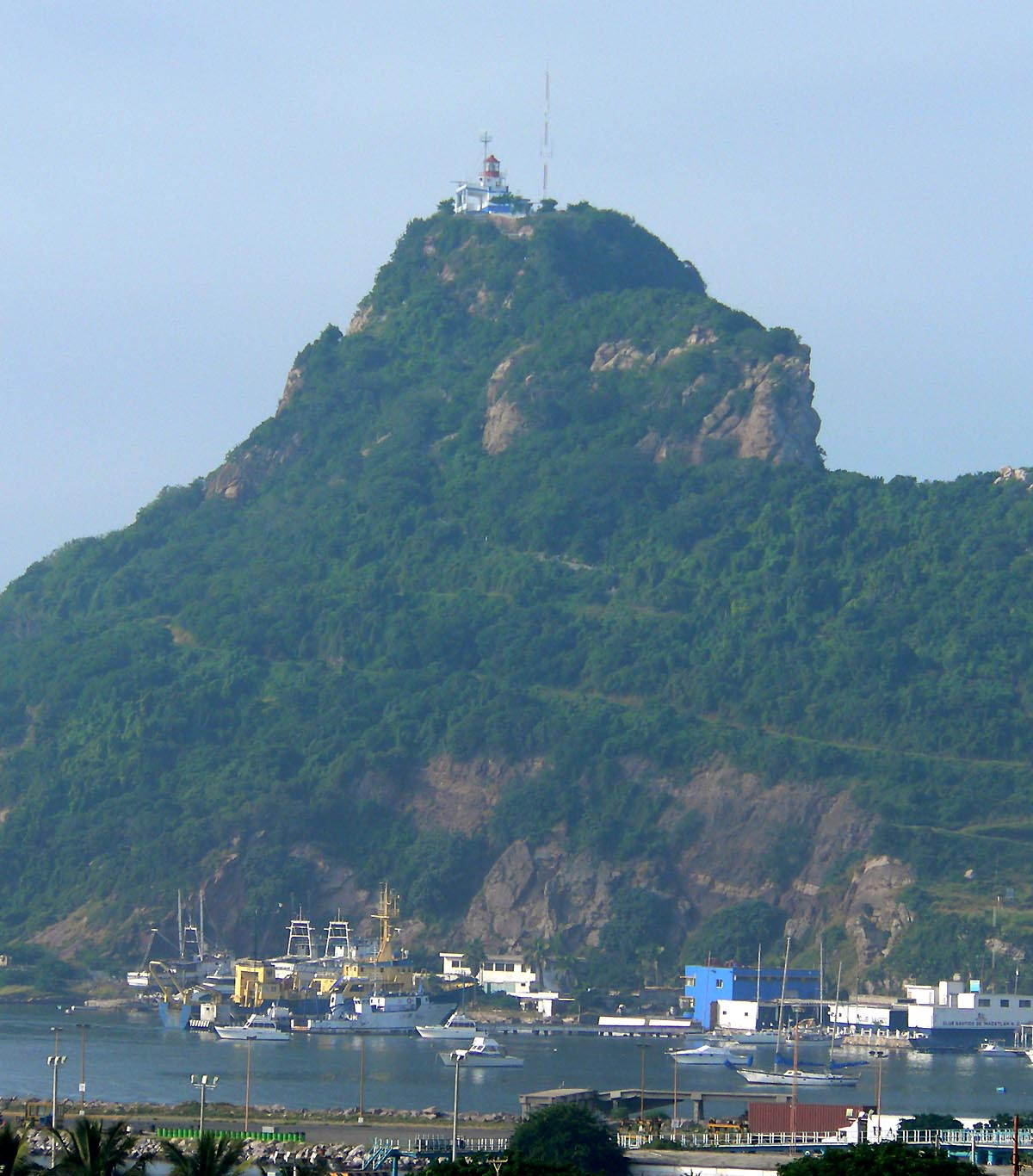
Mazatlán Lighthouse (El Faro)

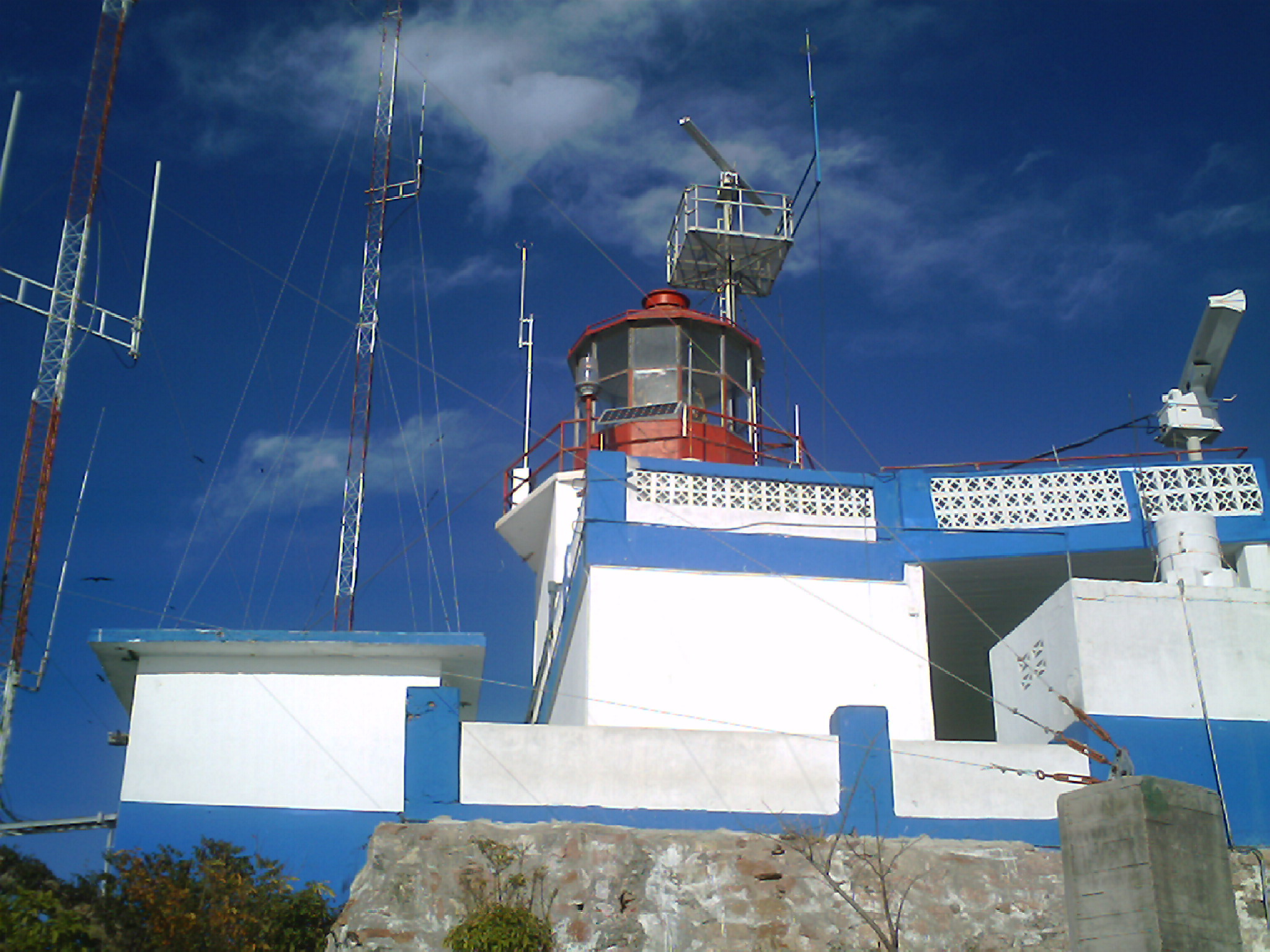
Mazatlán lighthouse seen up close

The Mazatlán lighthouse, called El Faro Lighthouse, is located at the peak of Cerro del Crestón, at the southern end of the peninsular city of Mazatlán. The lighthouse has the distinction of being settled in what was formerly an island, and has a length of 641 meters by 321 meters and a height of 157 meters, making it the highest natural lighthouse in the Americas, and one of the highest operating lighthouses in the world.

In 1821, the Cortes of Cádiz issued a decree certifying the City of Mazatlán as the first port of height of the Mexican Pacific. This introduced Mazatlán as a viable destination for international trade. The decree, along with the rapid growth of large mining and commercial consortia, led to an intensified level of ship traffic. In those days, it was not uncommon for over 60 ships from Europe and the Far East, loaded with different types of merchandise, to reach the port each year. After several days of travel and trading of supplies, these boats would depart Mazatlán loaded with bars of gold and silver from the rich mines of the region.

While the exponential amount of growth in boat traffic into and out of the port undoubtedly benefited the region, it also presented a problem at night. At that time there was no way to indicate to boats in the dark where the marina was located, or how to enter and dock, making it hard for ships to be accurate, which often led to sailors endangering their boats.

The first use of the Isla de Crestón as a lighted marine signal was in 1828. The light facilities, located on top of an imposing hill, were very modest, consisting of only a small stone structure on which fires, fueled by whale oil and wood, or coconut chips, were lit. The fires were fed wood and coal, allowing them to produce a dim light that could only be seen within walking distance, making it of little help to seafarers, especially in bad weather.

El Faro became the answer to the problem. First lit over the Pacific Ocean in 1879, the lighthouse's original lamp was constructed in Paris. It was made of an oil lamp surrounded by mirrors, and a Fresnel lens to focus the light. This allowed El Faro's light to be seen from a much further distance, and thus give better navigation services, leading to approaches made with greater precision.

In 1905, the lamp was converted to hydrogen gas, and was made to be able to revolve in a full circle. The final update of the light source came in 1933, when it was converted to electricity, which is what is still there today. To emit its powerful light, El Faro uses a 1,000 watt bulb, which is focused by a Fresnel lens.

It is now one of the tourist attractions in the city of Mazatlán, and people can hike up to see it up close. The view from the lighthouse is also a draw for visitors.

=== Banda Sinaloense ===
Banda Sinaloense or Tambora is a type of musical ensemble, as well as a traditional and popular musical genre, which was established in the early twenties in the state of Sinaloa, in the northwestern region of Mexico. It originates in the European Fanfare style, however, like many other traditional Mexican ensembles, Banda Sinaloense groups perform a variety of musical forms, and their repertoire covers various traditional styles such as rancheras, corridos, polkas, waltzes, mazurkas, and chotis, all tailored to the sensitivity of the inhabitants of this Mexican region: music as well as romantic ballads such as Cumbia.

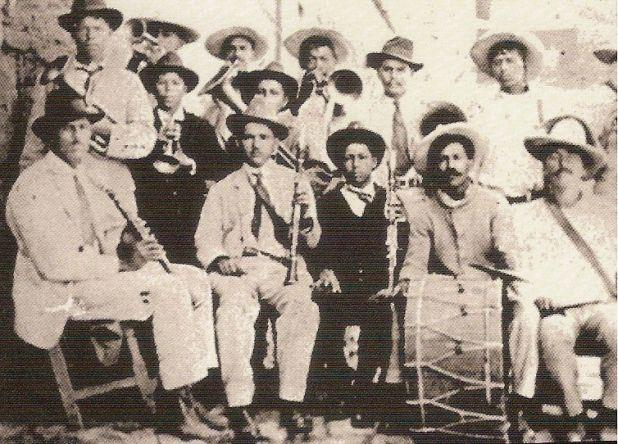
Example of a Sinaloa band in the early 1900s

The unique sound of the Sinaloa band is very similar to German and French wind instrument bands, though there are differences in styles between north-central and southern parts of the state. In the north-central area, the musical phrasing is lighter and nuanced, more similar to Western European styles, and in the south, the style has a very strong phrasing and a little less nuanced performance, more influenced by the Bavarian German style. Several researchers, have located the origin of these styles to these regions, especially considering foreign interventions in the state and in Mazatlán early in the century, which was inhabited mostly by German immigrants. However, the Swiss ethnomusicologist Helena Simonett explains that the first Sinaloense bands were formed by people who deserted the military and municipal bands, and went to live in mountain villages, adding credence to the Sinaloa founders with the rhythmic influence of Mayo-Yoreme, which have contributed to its essence. Nevertheless, there is an historic agreement which dates the musical influence before the Mazatlán German trade boom (1870–1890), as it would lead not only to distribution of instruments through marketing, but also required a cultural disclosure that could only happen in a close relationship between the carriers of such traditions and the people of the region, and this circumstance only occurred in Mazatlán. That is why the theory of French and Spanish influence on the German influence in other regions of Sinaloa is reinforced as the development of the music of the Sinaloan drum has records and previous history in distant places in the mountains of Sinaloa where there was no German influence. However, post-war French influence intervention and Spanish cultural remnants are present. There is also evidence of the formation of the first organological Mazatlán clusters as well as other parts of Sinaloa, for example: La Banda El Recodo de Don Cruz Lizarraga in 1938, which had a strong German influence in its playing style, and included stringed instruments, in contrast with La Banda Los Tacuichamona (1888), La Banda Los Sirolas Culiacán (1920) and The Band of Brothers Rubio (1929) Mocorito, which were exclusively wind instruments and percussion akin to the Galo-Ibérico fanfare style.

=== Sports ===
Baseball is popular among Mazatlecos. The representative team, called Venados de Mazatlán, is part of the Mexican Pacific League. The league's season begins in mid-October and ends in late December. Playoffs are in January of every year, and from the eight teams that make up the league, one becomes the representative of Mexico in the Caribbean Series.

In Basketball the representative team, called Venados de Mazatlán, is part of the CIBACOPA. The league season is played from the last days of March until the first days of June, while the playoffs begin in mid-June and end the first days of July.

Another sport that has been practiced for over 25 years is soccer, with major achievements both statewide and nationally. On June 2, 2020, it was announced that Liga MX club Monarcas Morelia would be relocating to a new state of the art football stadium in Mazatlán in time for the league's 2020–21 season, with rumors that the team would be renamed either Delfines de Mazatlán (Dolphins of Mazatlán) or Mazatlán F.C.

Mazatlán is a major sporting center of the country, with important sporting activities such as the marathon and triathlon, in which not only local but also foreign athletes participate.

One of the initial cricket teams in Mazatlán were the Mazatlán Redskins. They now play American football, soccer, and volleyball.

=== La Isla de la Piedra ===
La Isla de la Piedra, called Stone Island was born in 1936. Stone Island is known throughout Mexico for its long sandy beaches, Mexico's third largest coconut grove followed by the length of the southern beach which seems to disappears in the horizon. The main source of work for the residents of the island is fishing and transportation, as they bring many tourist and locals to the island from Mazatlán due to its popularity. To get to the island, it is possible to go by ferry, water taxi or drive by the 15 Mexico-Nogales road. Activities on the island include boat excursions, swimming, beach activities, and horseback riding.

=== Mazatlán Aquarium ===
Since its opening on September 13, 1980, Mazatlán Aquarium has been one of the most complete of its kind in Latin America.

It was divided into two main areas, the aquarium and the botanical garden. The aquarium contained exhibits for 50 different fish species and a museum that had temporary exhibitions and permanent displays that included shells, snails, and materials relating to the marine ecosystem. The botanical garden consisted of 1 hectare which included 75 tree species from around the world, and regional species of Sinaloa.

On May 30, 2023, the Gran Acuario Mazatlán was inaugurated, replacing and expanding the old aquarium that was in its place, it was the largest aquarium in Latin America.

=== Observatorio 1873 ===
Observatorio 1873 is a tourism park in Mazatlán. In the middle of the 19th century, it began as a military lookout point for defending Mazatlán against hostile ships and piracy. It was transformed in 1873 into Observatorio Mazatlán, an observatory focused on data collection in meteorology and seismology. Observatorio 1837 opened for visitors in February 2020. It includes an agave garden, a whale museum, a manor house museum, an aviary, an iguana sanctuary, a zip line, and a rooftop bar and restaurant.

=== Gastronomy ===
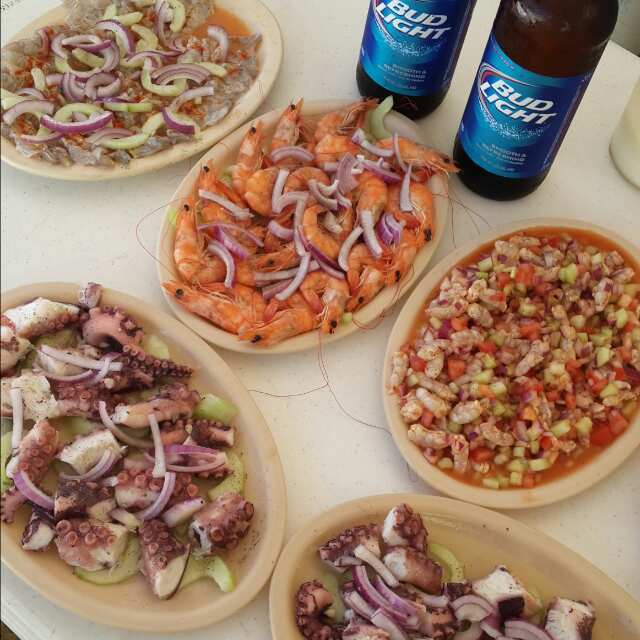
Local Mazatlán dishes

Main dishes in Mazatlán are heavily influenced by seafood. Food specialties include ceviches, cocktails, zarandeado fish, and aguachile. Other common and prominent foods are smoked marlin and tuna, chilorio, bearded tamales (made with shrimp), Governor tacos, fish crackers and Sinaloa-style grill-roasted chicken.

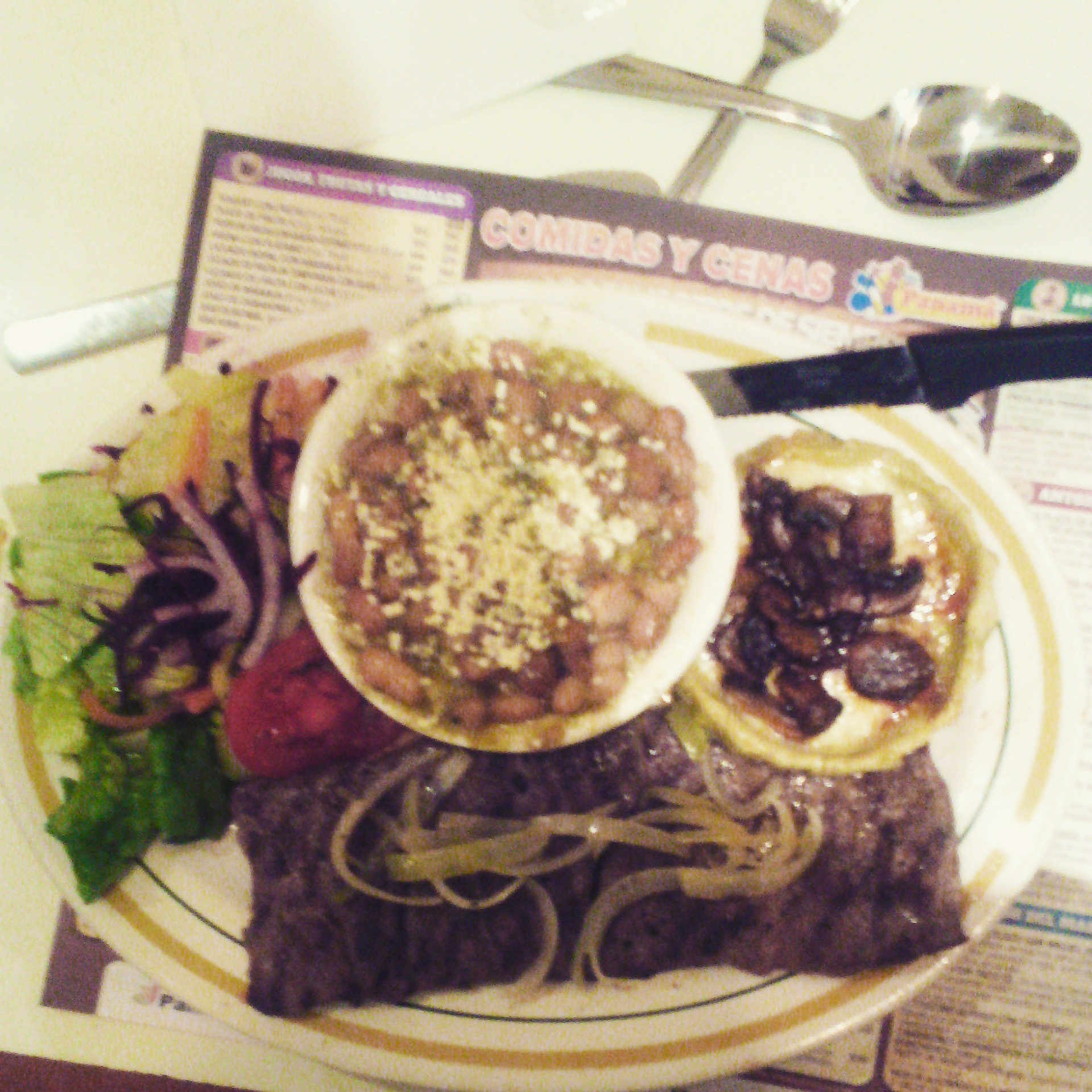
Dish from an informal restaurant in Mazatlán

There is also a variety of restaurants offering international cuisine such as Japanese, Italian and Chinese. Fast food, vegetarian, snacks, meats, and a variety of taquerias with their own specialty foods are also available.

The local cuisine offers a variety of fresh drinks such as horchata, barley, coconut, coconut horchata, Tejuino, wines and a range of beers, of which the best known is the local beer called Pacífico, which has its factory in the harbor. Another well-known drink in the region is a vanilla-flavored beverage called "tonicol."

Typical sweets include coconut candies, jamoncillos, and other candy made with coconut marshmallows from the region.

== Transportation ==
The Mazatlán International Airport (IATA Code: MZT) has daily domestic flights and international flights to the United States and Canada.

By land, Mazatlán is connected to the north (Culiacán) and south (Tepic) and to Guadalajara via highway 15 and the corresponding tolled Federal Highway 15D. To the east, it is connected to Durango by Highway 40 and the corresponding Federal Highway 40D.

Ferries make the daily journey to La Paz, Baja California Sur, while a varied number of cruise ships visit the port every week from the United States.

=== Durango-Mazatlán highway ===
The Durango-Mazatlán highway is a highway that link the cities of Mazatlán and Durango, crossing the Sierra Madre Occidental.

Key Features

- 230 km in length
- 63 tunnels
- 115 bridges including the Baluarte Bridge
- Two-lane and four-lane sections
- Initial estimated cost for the work was 3.5 billion pesos, with a final estimate of 28.6 billion pesos
- Generating 4,500 direct jobs and 10,000 indirect jobs
- Stretch of 7.7 km of 4 lanes (including the Baluarte Bridge)

Main sections

- "The Sinaloa" tunnel, measuring 2,794 meters
- Baluarte bridge with a center span of 520 meters and a total length of 1,124 meters
- Bridge Parlors

Time reduction of 6–8 hours to 3 hours.

Pulmonias are a common form of transportation in Mazatlán. These golf cart-like taxis are a form of transportation created in Mazatlán.

=== The Malecón of Mazatlán ===
The Malecón (boardwalk) of Mazatlán is to be considered one of the longest in the world. Its length is about 8.5 kilometres (5.3 mi) along the Pacific coast. Along the Malecón are high cliffs, monuments, roundabouts, historical buildings, hotels, etc. The Malecón is composed of a series of roadways with designated space for pedestrians. The names of these roads vary depending on the stage or time of their construction. From south to north, the roads that compose the Malecón are as follow:

- Calz. Joel Montes Camarena: which connects the lighthouse, which used to be an island, to the rest of the city.
- Paseo del Centenario: starting in the previous street and bordering the west at the lookout hill where cliffs are seen, it was built to commemorate the centennial of the Independence of Mexico.
- Paseo Olas Altas: the oldest section of the boardwalk, it was originally a dike to prevent flooding problems in the 1830s, then it became an embankment which was used as urban space, and eventually it became a recreational space. It was the first part of the city with street lighting, and includes the south side of icebox hill and lookout hill.
- Paseo Claussen: It was built for the centennial in 1910. It borders the icebox hill and ends at the bay of Puerto Viejo. It was named in honor of George Claussen, who was in command of the Mazatlán Works Agency and promoted the centennial project.
- Avenida del Mar: This is the most representative and longest section of the boardwalk; it extends along the bay of Puerto Viejo and comprises just over half of all the boardwalk. The panoramic tour ends at the tip, which initiates the Golden Zone (the primary hotel zone), and the avenue changes names twice and continues for several kilometers parallel to the coastline, yet maintains some distance from the coastal hotels.

== Politics ==
In the municipality of Mazatlán, two electoral preferences exist. While the inhabitants of the receiverships, police stations, and other villages in the municipality continue voting traditionally for the Institutional Revolutionary Party (PRI), this phenomenon is changing within the city.

Mazatlán has traditionally been governed by municipal leaders from the ruling Institutional Revolutionary Party. During the municipal elections of 1989, Humberto Rice García (1990–1992) won the municipal presidency as a candidate for the National Action Party (PAN). However, the Institutional Revolutionary Party regained the municipality during the elections of 1992, when Martin Gavica Garduño (1993–1995) won the leadership. Alejandro Camacho Mendoza reclaimed the municipality for his party, PAN, for the 1996–1998 period, and Alejandro Higuera Osuna held it for the 1999–2001 term.

In the 2002–2004 elections, both the National Action Party and the Institutional Revolutionary Party (PRI) were defeated by the Labour Party candidate, Jorge Alberto Rodriguez Pasos. However, a few months after taking the oath of mayor, Rodriguez Pasos was deposed by the State Congress after being charged for domestic violence, in which his own wife accused him. His place was taken by Gerardo Ramirez Rosete, from the same party. Shortly thereafter, in a move seen as a ruse of the PRI state government, he was replaced by Ricardo Ramírez González, a member of the Institutional Revolutionary Party.

In the 2005–2007 elections, Alejandro Higuera Osuna from PAN won the municipal presidency and held it until June 2007, when he resigned to contest the election for local deputy; on the 12th of that month, he was replaced by Isaac Lopez Arregui.

In the 2008–2010 elections, the Institutional Revolutionary Party regained the town with its candidate Jorge Abel Lopez Sanchez.

Since April 2010, the town of Mazatlán has been ruled by both the Institutional Revolutionary Party (PRI) and the National Action Party, since the last mayoral election was won by PRI member Jorge Abel Lopez Sanchez, who defeated a former PAN and Petetista government (PT). That was the last time that Mazatlán has had a PRI government.

In July 2010, in the election for Governor, Local, and Municipal presidents' Deputies, the first loss occurred for the PRI governor of Sinaloa. Mario López Valdez, former Sinaloa Senator and member of the PRI, was defeated. This ended the PRI hegemony in the state of Sinaloa. Another important event was the third choice Alejandro Higuera Osuna from PAN, who won the municipal presidency of Mazatlán. In addition, the PAN won a historic vote statewide.

== Educational institutions ==
French explorer Duflot de Mofras notes that by the 1840s, foreign traders based in Mazatlán impelled the opening of the first public school in the city. Still, in 1872, there were only two primary schools. In 1873, the Liceo Rosales, which over time would become the Autonomous University of Sinaloa, was founded.

Mazatlán has several preschools, elementary, middle, high schools, and universities of both public and private institutions. The Autonomous University of Sinaloa is the largest public university in the city. Other public universities or institutions for higher education include the University of the West and the Polytechnic University of Sinaloa. The remaining universities and institutions of higher education in Mazatlán belong to the private sector and they are the following: Mazatlán Institute of Technology, Nautical School of Mazatlán, TecMilenio University, Autonomous University of Durango, and the Sinaloa Superior Institute of Technology.

The National Autonomous University of Mexico, UNAM, has a presence in the city with an academic unit specializing in marine sciences and the Center for Food Research and Development.

== Notable people ==
- Enedina Arellano Félix, Mexican drug lord, current leader of Tijuana Cartel, younger sister of Benjamín Arellano Félix and older sister of Ramón Arellano Félix.
- Eden Estrada, model and social media influencer.
- Sara Ramírez, actor and singer, known for the role of Dr.Callie Torres in the TV series Grey's Anatomy.
- Andrew Jackson Grayson (1819–1869), ornithologist and artist died in Mazatlán.
- Pedro Infante, Actor and Singer. Winner of a Golden Bear.
- Jorge Orta, former designated hitter and right fielder for the Chicago White Sox and Kansas City Royals.
- Roberto Blancarte, sociologist, historian and social scientist.
- Kenia Os, singer and former YouTuber.
- José Urquidy, current pitcher for the Houston Astros, World Series Champion.

== Gallery ==
Mazatlán

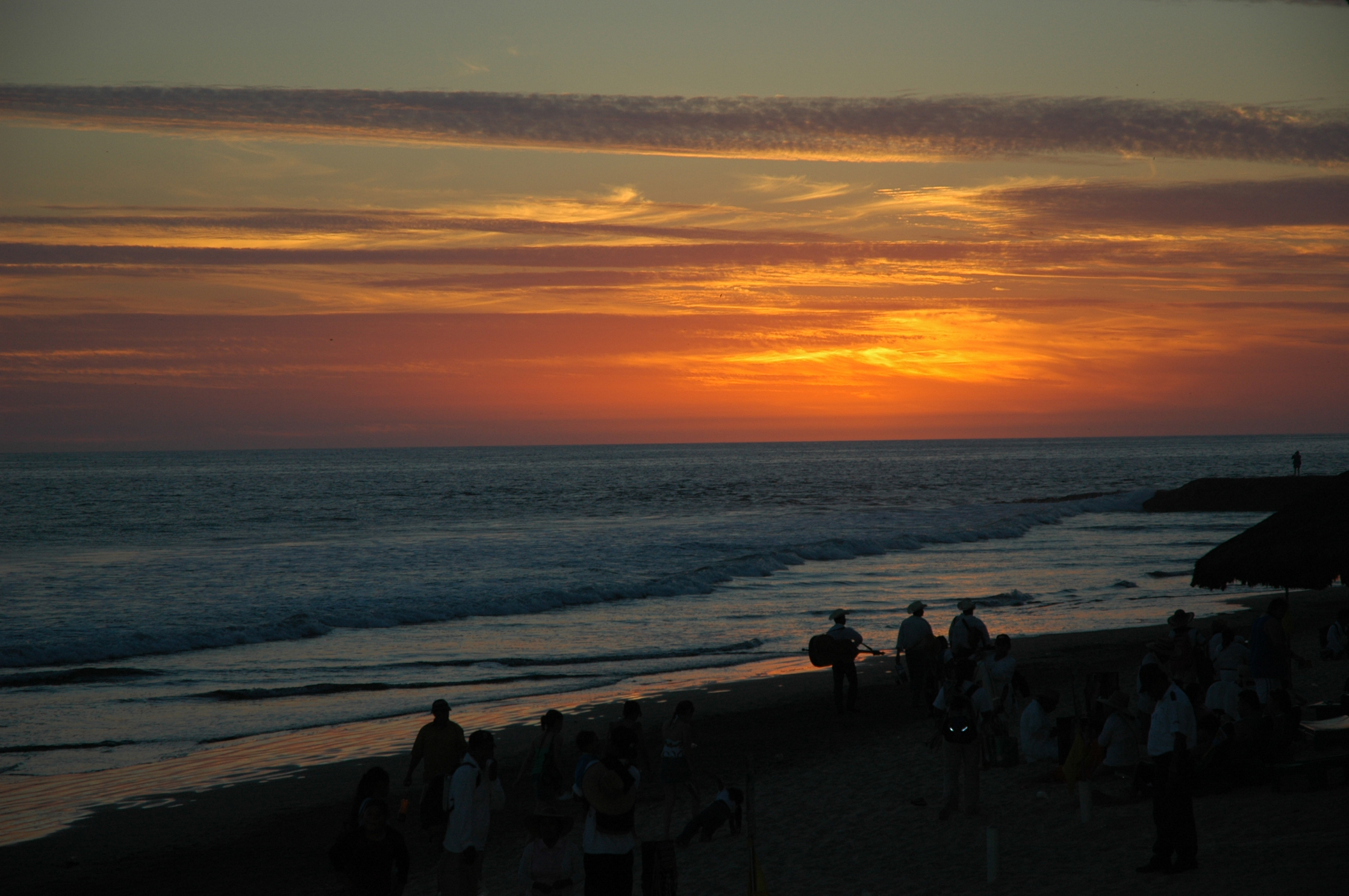
Easter sunset

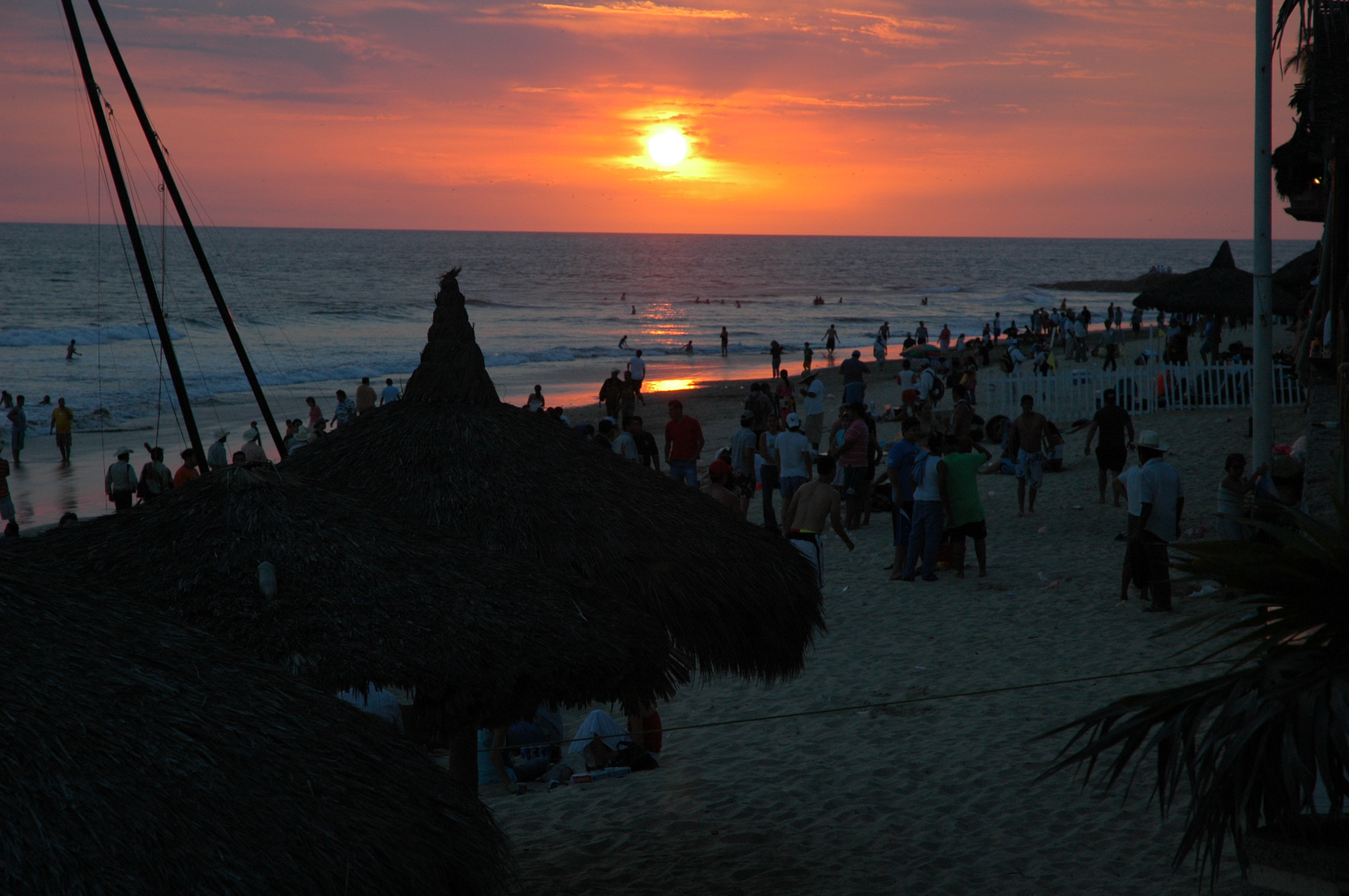
Easter sunset at the beach

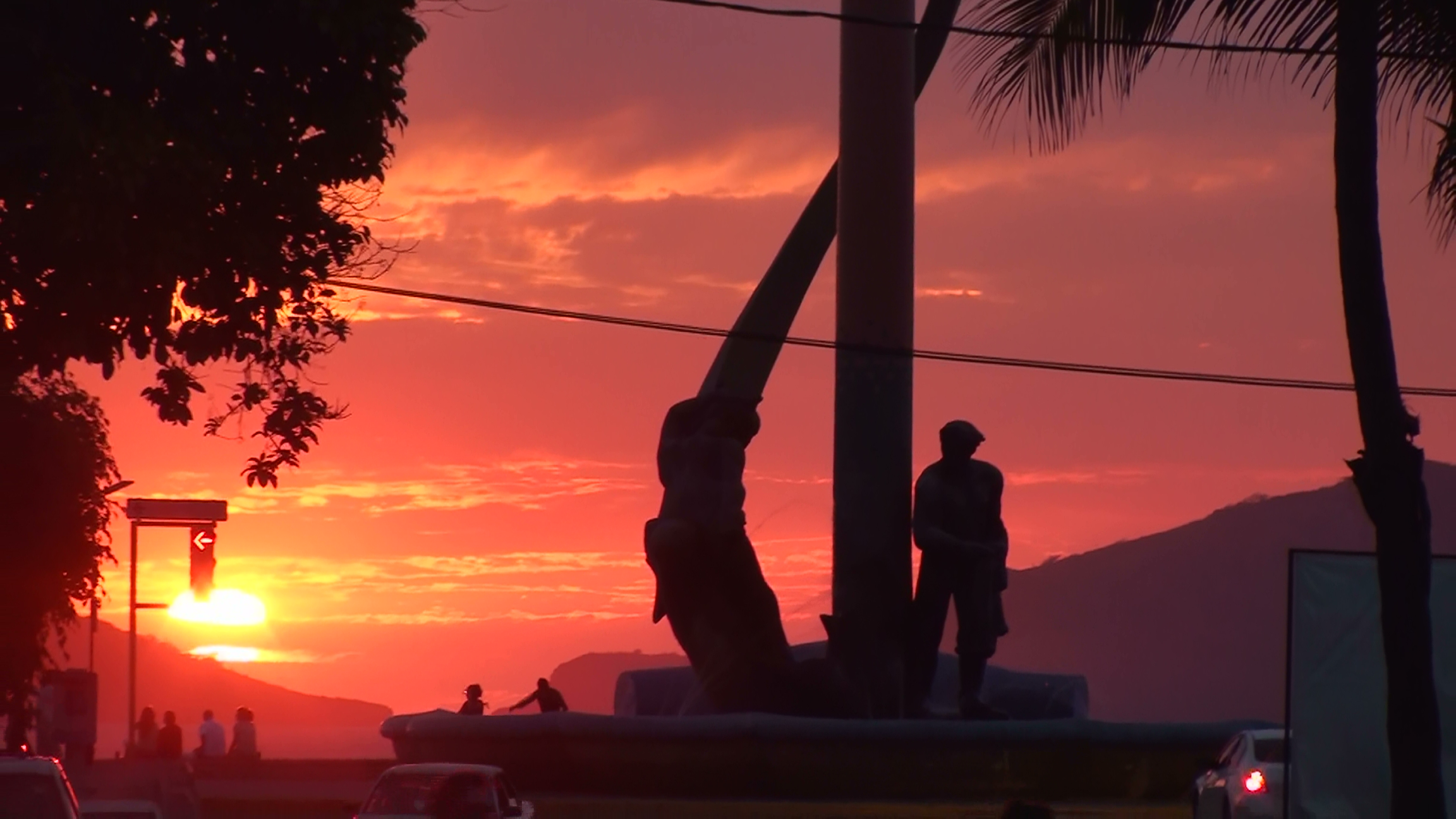
Sunset at El Pescador Monument in Playa Norte

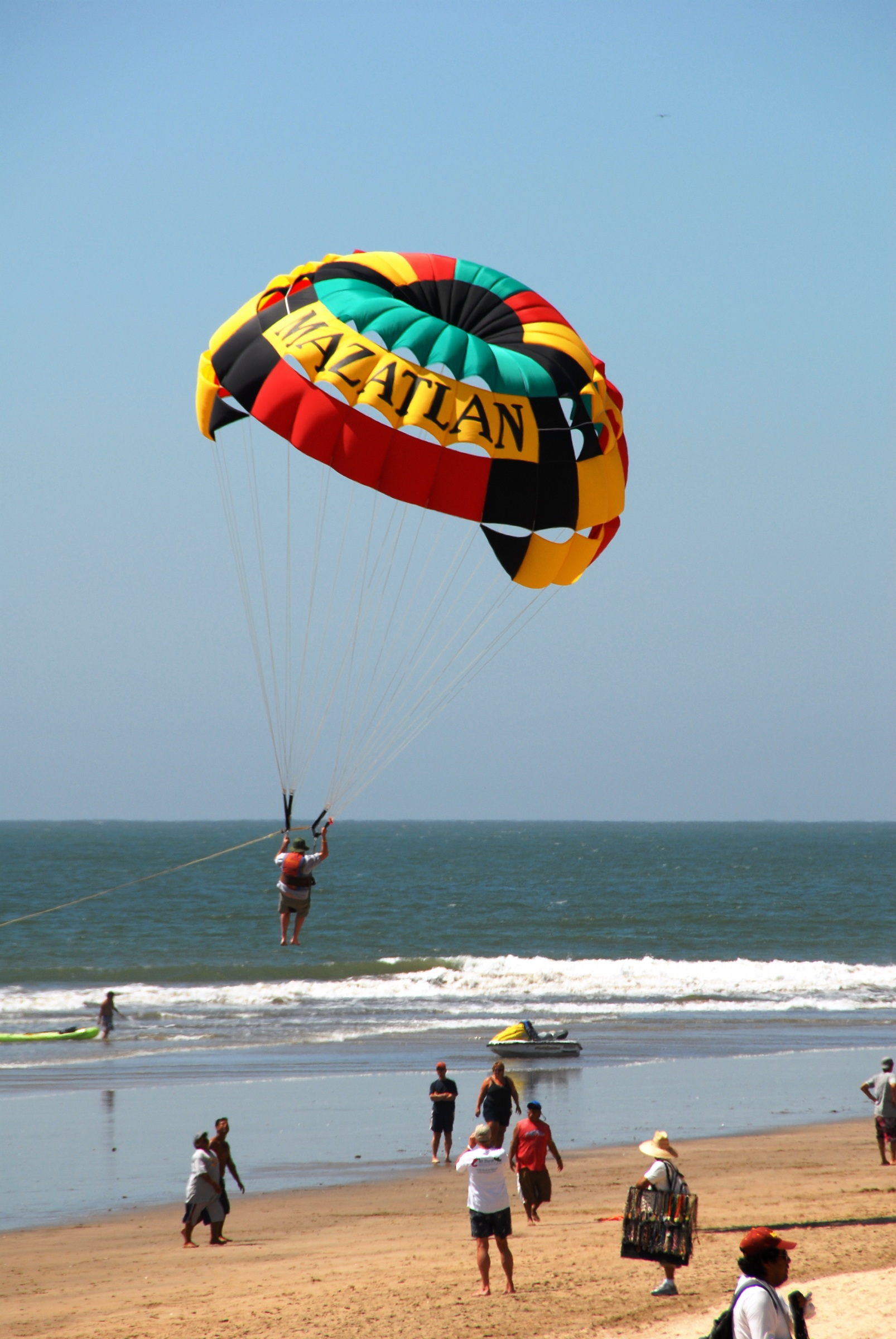
Parasailing near the Hotel Playa Mazatlán

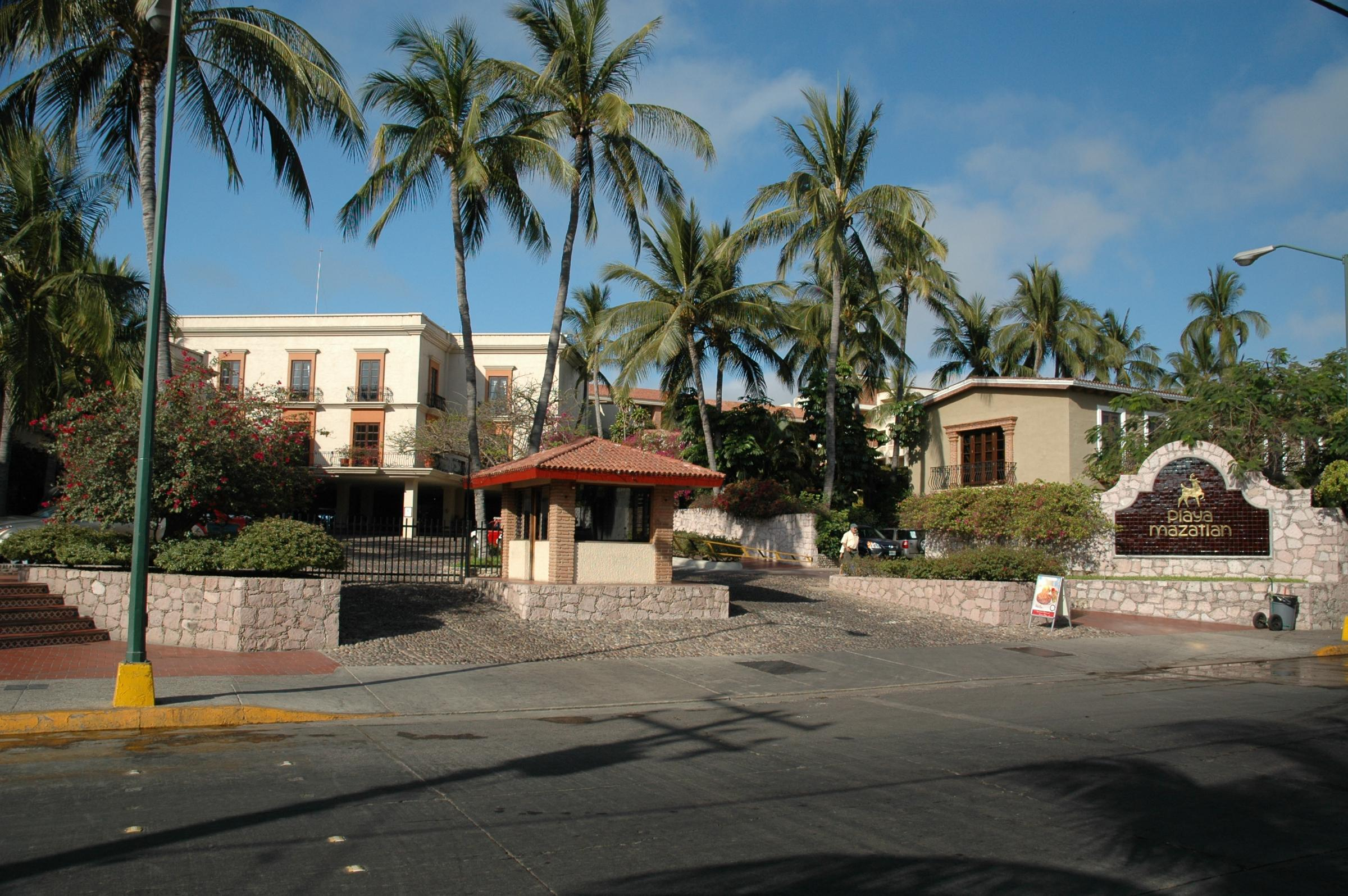
Main entrance to the Hotel Playa Mazatlán

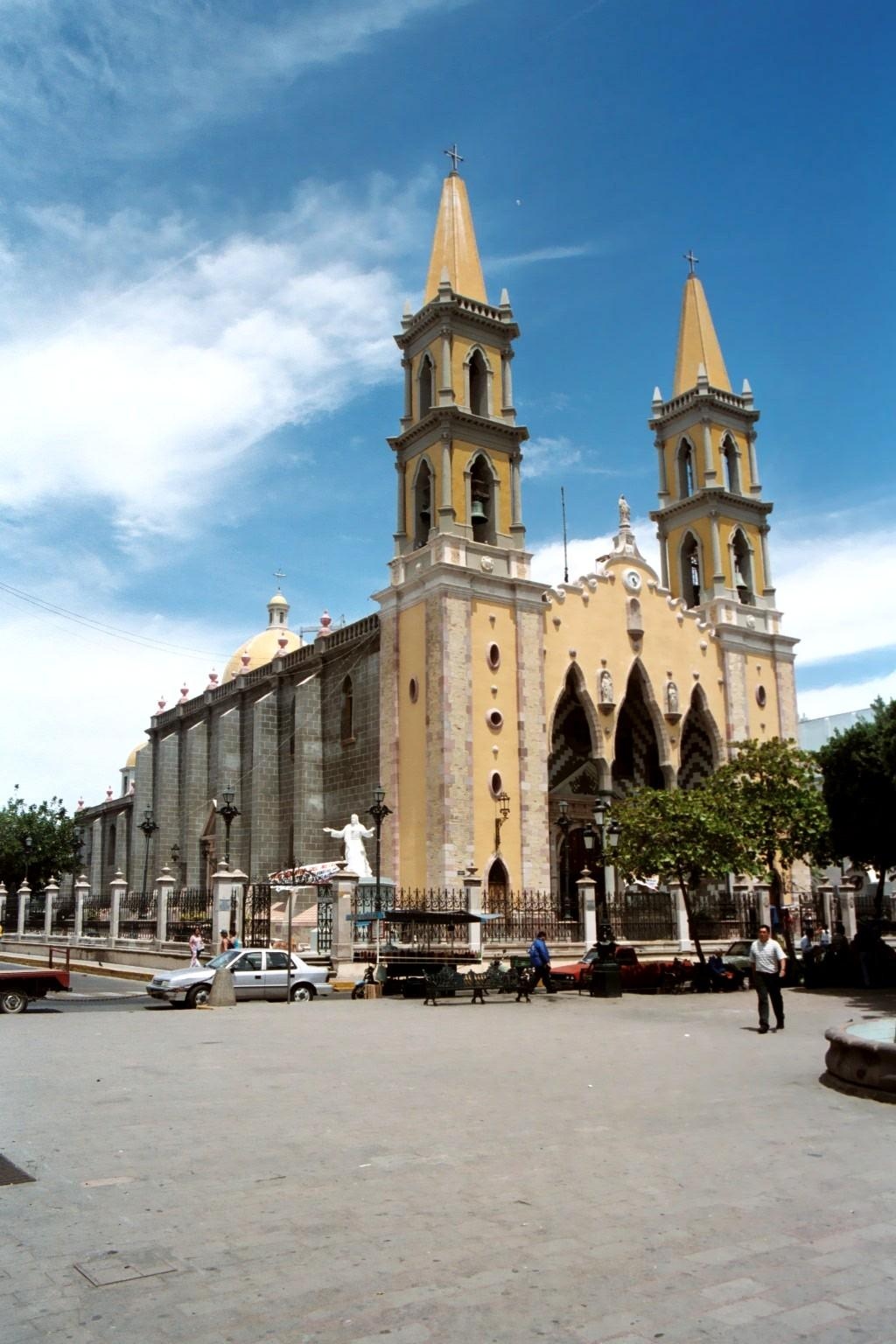
Cathedral in the downtown

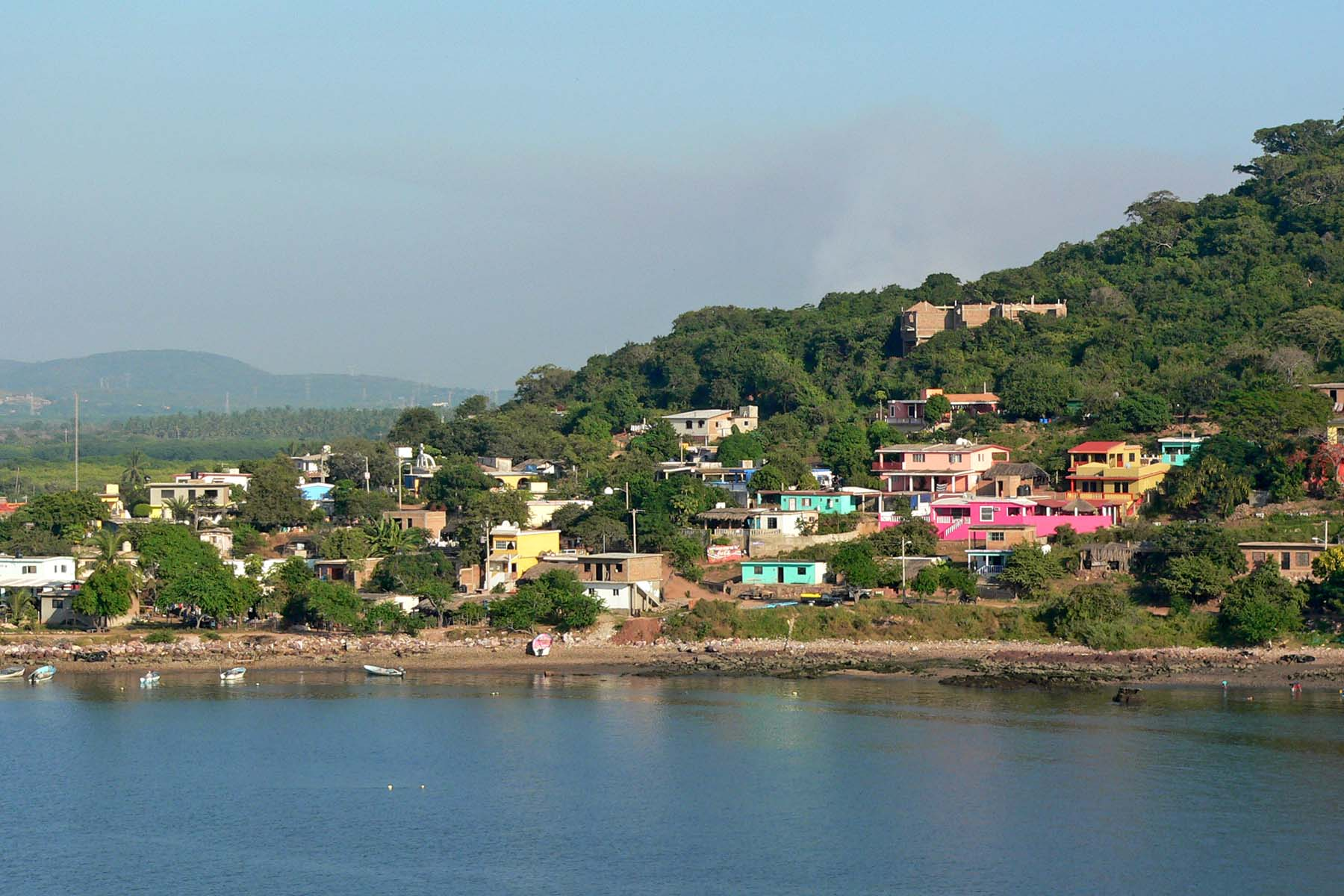
Isla de la Piedra

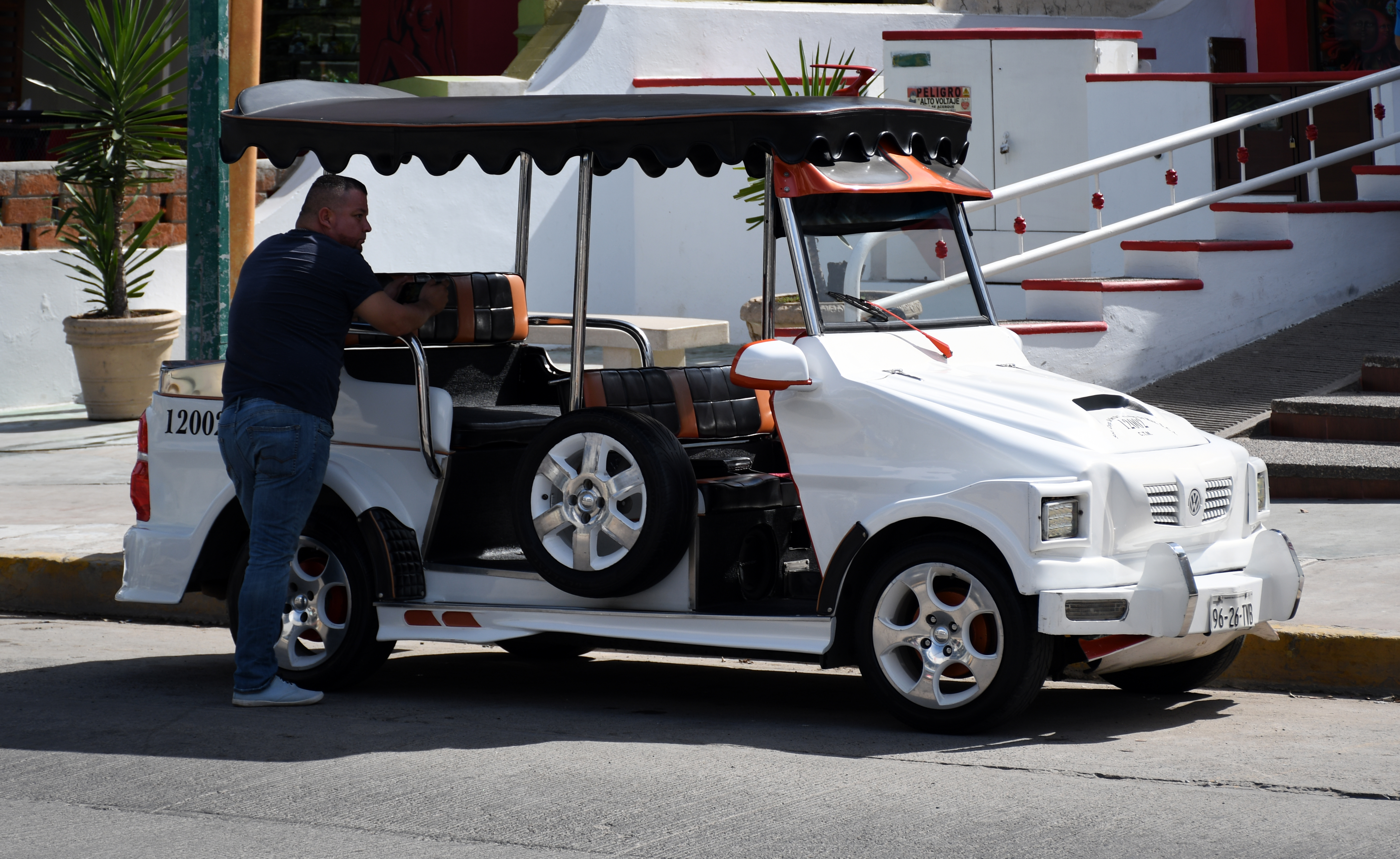
Pulmonia

== Sister cities ==
- Hamm, North Rhine-Westphalia, Germany
- Santa Monica, California, United States
- Seattle, Washington, United States
- San Ysidro, San Diego, California, United States
- Tucson, Arizona, United States
- Puntarenas, Puntarenas Province, Costa Rica
- Grande Prairie, Alberta, Canada
- Ensenada, Baja California, Mexico
- Tijuana, Baja California, Mexico
- Pico Rivera, California, United States

== See also ==
- Cathedral Basilica of the Immaculate Conception, Mazatlán
- Las Labradas
- Mexican Riviera
