= Hurricane Doria =

Category 1 Atlantic hurricane in 1967

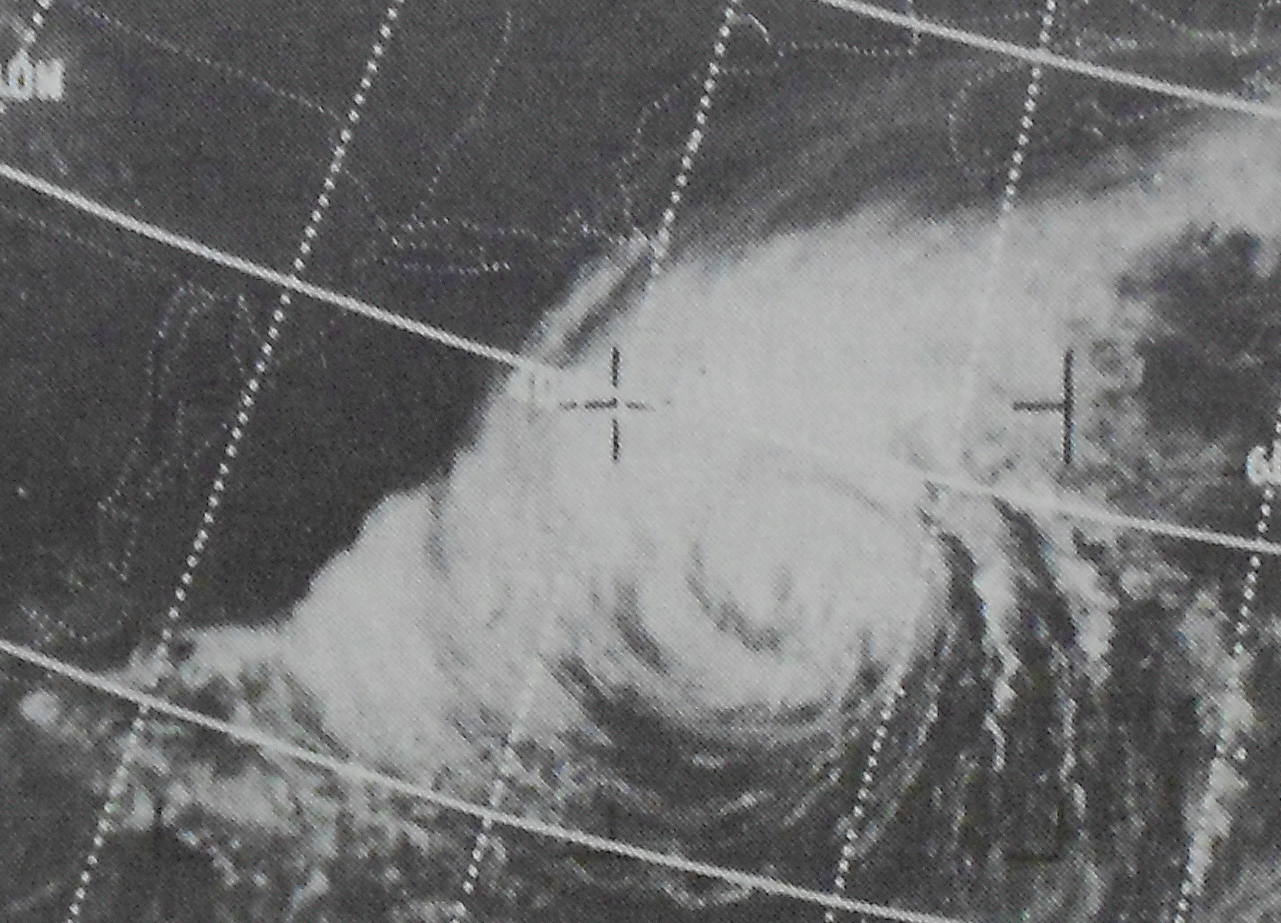
- Doria on September 14

Meteorological history
- Formed: September 8, 1967
- Dissipated: September 21, 1967

Category 2 hurricane
- 1-minute sustained (SSHWS/NWS)
- Highest winds: 100 mph (155 km/h)
- Lowest pressure: 973 mbar (hPa); 28.73 inHg

Overall effects
- Fatalities: 3
- Damage: $150,000 (1967 USD)
- Areas affected: East Coast of the United States
- IBTrACS
- Part of the 1967 Atlantic hurricane season

Hurricane Doria was an unusual and erratic hurricane that existed during September 1967. The fourth named storm and hurricane of the 1967 Atlantic hurricane season, Doria developed on September 8 off the east coast of Florida. It meandered until attaining tropical storm status, at which point the storm accelerated towards the northeast. On September 10, Doria intensified into a Category 2 hurricane on the modern-day Saffir–Simpson Hurricane Scale. After moving out to sea, the storm turned westward towards the United States. A compact cyclone, Doria weakened to a tropical storm shortly before moving ashore in the Mid-Atlantic States. The storm ultimately dissipated on September 21.

The storm, which ultimately made landfall near the Virginia–North Carolina border, produced high winds along the coast from New Jersey through North Carolina. A small boat sank off the coast of New Jersey, killing three of its occupants. Overall damage was estimated around $150,000 (1967 USD), although the storm overall was considered beneficial.

== Meteorological history ==
Map plotting the storm's track and intensity, according to the Saffir–Simpson scale Map key Saffir–Simpson scale Tropical depression (≤38 mph, ≤62 km/h) Tropical storm (39–73 mph, 63–118 km/h) Category 1 (74–95 mph, 119–153 km/h) Category 2 (96–110 mph, 154–177 km/h) Category 3 (111–129 mph, 178–208 km/h) Category 4 (130–156 mph, 209–251 km/h) Category 5 (≥157 mph, ≥252 km/h) Unknown Storm type Tropical cyclone Subtropical cyclone Extratropical cyclone, remnant low, tropical disturbance, or monsoon depression

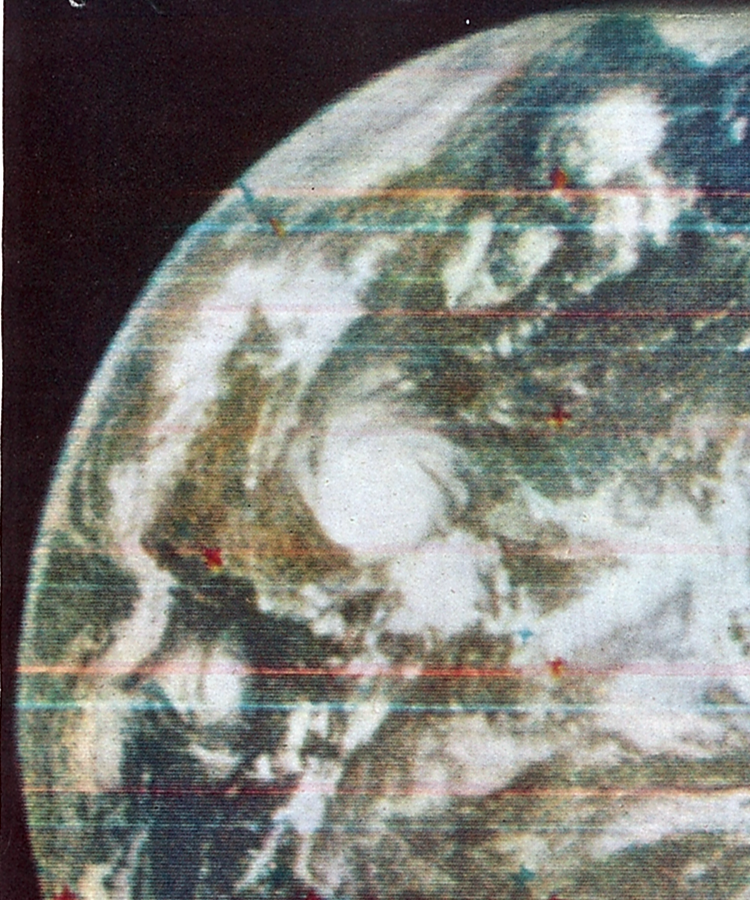
The remnants of Hurricane Doria (top right) alongside Hurricane Beulah (center), Tropical Storm Monica (bottom left), and Tropical Storm Nanette (far bottom left).

The origins of Hurricane Doria are traced back to an area of disturbed weather off the northeastern coast of Florida on September 4. For several days, the low pressure system meandered as its central barometric pressure gradually fell. The storm is estimated to have organized into a tropical depression at 0000 UTC on September 8. At the time, it was situated north of Grand Bahama Island. Drifting westward, the cyclone attained tropical storm intensity early the next day. Doria turned northeastward and accelerated as it moved away from Florida. On September 10, the tropical storm achieved hurricane force. Cold air became entrained into the hurricane's circulation by September 11, causing it to weaken to a tropical storm. However, its forward motion slowed and it once again strengthened.

The hurricane moved eastward, seemingly out to sea. However, an area of high pressure over New England began to steer Doria westward on September 13. The hurricane continued to strengthen, and it is estimated to have peaked with maximum sustained winds of 100 mph (155 km/h) and a minimum air pressure of 973 mbar (hPa; 28.73 inHg). It maintained these winds for approximately 18 hours, before weakening slightly late on September 14. In his 2007 book "Hurricanes and the Middle Atlantic States", Rick Schwartz compared Doria to the 1933 Chesapeake–Potomac hurricane, citing similar intensities, tracks, and forward speeds. On September 16, the storm weakened to a tropical storm in a colder, drier environment. As it turned southward, Doria quickly weakened. Initial forecasts suggested the possibility for the storm to maintain its severity and move ashore between Maryland and New Jersey.

Continually deteriorating, Doria made landfall near the Virginia–North Carolina border, and moved south over land. It reemerged over open waters on September 17, and at around the same time, it weakened to a tropical depression. It curved southeastward as a weak depression, and several days later it was still identifiable as a storm system south of the island of Bermuda. It dissipated on September 21. Doria had an unusual and capricious track, described as "one of the most erratic storms ever observed".

== Impact ==
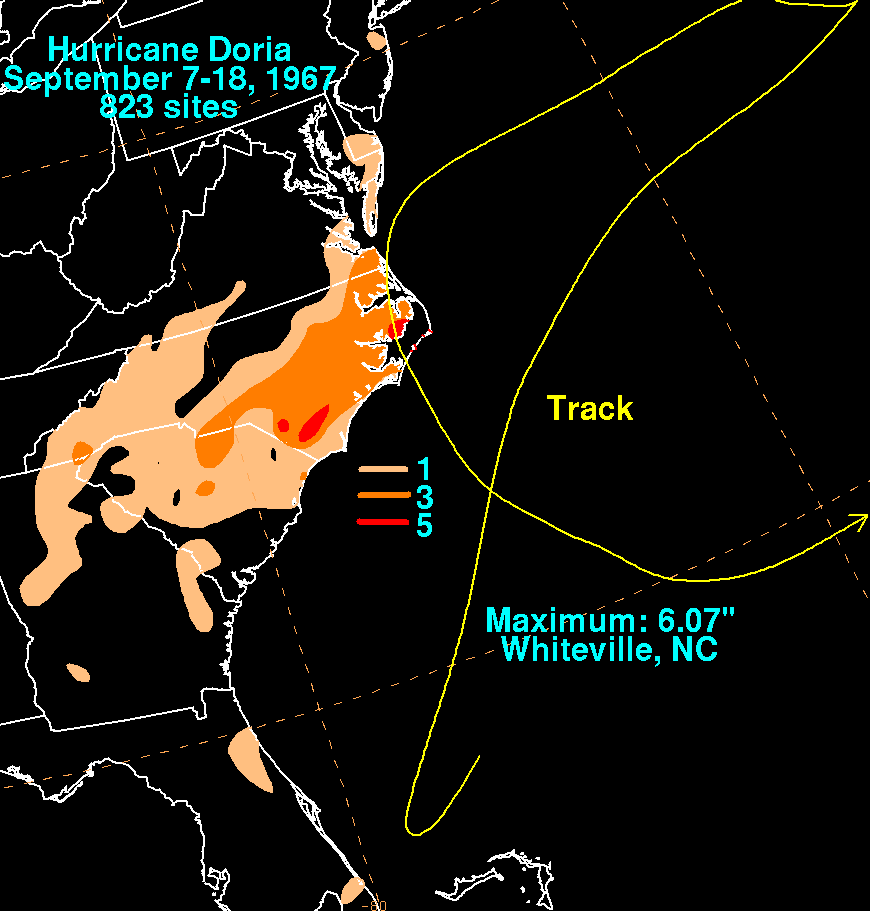
Rainfall totals associated with Hurricane Doria

In advance of the storm, hurricane warnings were issued for much of the East Coast of the United States. For 19 hours, about 260 mi (420 km) of shoreline was under an advisory. At least 400 people were evacuated from their homes in southern New Jersey and 6,600 from Ocean City, Maryland.

Doria was a small storm, although it brought high winds and moderate coastal flooding to some areas; generally light rainfall was also observed. In North Carolina, 6.09 in (155 mm) of precipitation fell at Whiteville. Flash flooding and the overflowing of storm sewers ensued in the southeastern portions of the state; there were also losses to crops, especially corn, cotton, and tobacco. In Virginia, strong winds were reported along the coast, with gusts up to 60 mph (97 km/h) at Wallops Island. Along the east coast of the state, winds damaged trees, roofs, signs, and billboards. In Maryland, similar impact occurred in Ocean City, with damage sustained to signs and billboards and tore the roof of a prefabricated home; a city boardwalk also sustained storm-related damage.

A station at the Indian River Inlet in Delaware recorded a tide 6.5 ft (2.0 m) above-normal; the highest sustained winds reported on land association with the storm, 50 mph (80 km/h), also occurred there. Atlantic City, New Jersey, recorded a peak gust of 39 mph (63 km/h), with rainfall amounting to 0.53 in (13 mm). Damage from the storm was generally light. Off the coast of Ocean City, New Jersey, a cabin cruiser sank in 25-ft (7.6 m) seas. Three of the vessel's occupants, a mother and her two sons, drowned. In Massachusetts, some small boats sank at the harbors. At Ipswich Bay, 10 people required rescue after two boats capsized. Minor beach erosion was reported at Nantucket. Overall damage was estimated at $150,000, which was considered minor. The storm's passage was considered beneficial, due to adding sand to beaches and providing favorable rains.

== See also ==
- List of North Carolina hurricanes
- List of United States hurricanes
