= 1967 Atlantic hurricane season =

- Season summary map

Seasonal boundaries
- First system formed: June 10, 1967
- Last system dissipated: November 2, 1967

Strongest storm
- Name: Beulah
  - Maximum winds: 160 mph (260 km/h) (1-minute sustained)
  - Lowest pressure: 921 mbar (hPa; 27.2 inHg)

Seasonal statistics
- Total depressions: 18
- Total storms: 13
- Hurricanes: 6
- Major hurricanes (Cat. 3+): 1
- Total fatalities: 79
- Total damage: $235 million (1967 USD)

Related articles
- 1967 Pacific hurricane season; 1967 Pacific typhoon season; 1967 North Indian Ocean cyclone season

The 1967 Atlantic hurricane season was an active Atlantic hurricane season overall, producing 13 nameable storms, of which 6 strengthened into hurricanes. The season officially began on June 1, 1967, and lasted until November 30, 1967. These dates, adopted by convention, historically describe the period in each year when most tropical cyclogenesis occurs in the Atlantic Ocean. The season's first system, Tropical Depression One, formed on June 10, and the last, Tropical Storm Heidi, lost tropical characteristics on November 2.

Hurricane Beulah, the strongest storm of the season, and only major hurricane (Category 3 or above on the Saffir–Simpson scale), was also the most damaging. It caused 59 deaths and $235 million in damage (1967 USD) along its two-week-long path. Beulah formed on September 5 and soon after crossed southern Martinique into the Caribbean Sea. On the island, it dropped 18.7 in (475 mm) of rainfall in Les Anses-d'Arlet, causing severe flooding. Widespread evacuations occurred along the southern coast of the Dominican Republic due to fears of a repeat of Hurricane Inez from the previous year. After brushing the south coast of Hispaniola, the hurricane weakened and re-intensified, striking the Yucatán Peninsula and later near the United States/Mexico border. There, it caused severe river flooding, killing 34 people in the two countries.

Hurricanes Arlene and Chloe, as well as several tropical depressions, originated from tropical waves that left the coast of Africa. Chloe lasted for nearly 17 days, eventually dissipating over France after wrecking a ship offshore northern Spain, killing 14 people. Hurricane Doria co-existed with Beulah and Chloe, taking an unusual trajectory over the eastern United States; it killed three people in a boating accident offshore New Jersey. In late September, Tropical Storm Edith was a minimal storm that moved through the Lesser Antilles without serious impact. Hurricane Fern killed three people when it struck Mexico north of Tampico.

== Season summary ==
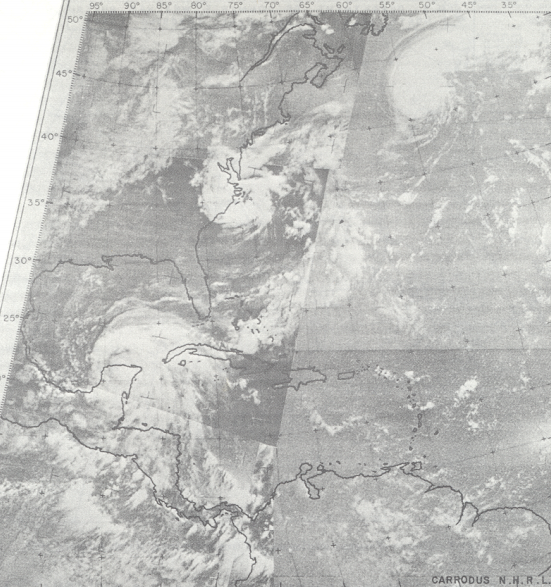
Composite of ESSA-2 photographs showing hurricanes Beulah (lower left), Doria (left center), and Chloe (upper right), on September 17

The 1967 Atlantic hurricane season officially began on June 1, and ran through November 30. These dates historically describe the period in each year when most tropical cyclones form in the Atlantic Ocean. Tropical cyclogenesis, the process in which a tropical cyclone develops, resulted mainly from tropical waves, the Intertropical Convergence Zone (ITCZ), and decaying frontal systems. There were 30 tropical waves that exited the west coast of Africa at Dakar, Senegal; another 20 tropical disturbances originated offshore the Mid-Atlantic states, and 7 disturbances derived from cold-core lows. A total of 18 tropical depressions (tropical cyclones with maximum sustained winds of 38 mph (62 km/h) or less) formed during the season, 13 of which developed into named storms. Of those, six strengthened into hurricanes, while 1 system reached major hurricane intensity. This was the first season that non-developing tropical depressions were included into HURDAT, the National Hurricane Center—managed tropical cyclone database.

Satellite timelapse captured by the ESSA-5 satellite featuring Hurricane’s Beulah, Chloe, and Doria throughout September.

The season got off to a slow start, with the first operationally named storm, Arlene, not forming until August 28. The latency was caused by a stronger than normal ridge across the Atlantic Ocean, which suppressed convective activity across the basin and prevented the formation of strong low pressure areas. The season came to life in September, as seven tropical storms formed, including hurricanes Beulah, Chloe, and Doria. The season's overall activity was reflected with an above normal Accumulated Cyclone Energy (ACE) index of 121.7 units. ACE is, broadly speaking, a measure of the power of the hurricane multiplied by the length of time it existed, so storms that last a long time, as well as particularly strong hurricanes, such as Beulah, have high ACEs. It is only calculated for full advisories on tropical systems at or exceeding 39 mph (63 km/h), which is the threshold for tropical storm status.

== Systems ==
=== Mid-June tropical storm ===
- Tropical storm (SSHWS)
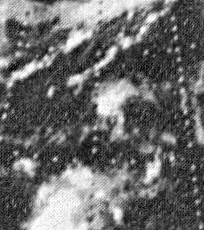
- Duration: June 15 – June 22
- Peak intensity: 40 mph (65 km/h) (1-min); 1006 mbar (hPa)

Satellite imagery and ship data indicated that Subtropical Depression Three formed at 18:00 UTC on June 14 to the northeast of the northeastern Bahamas, associated with an upper-level low. With a ridge to the northeast, the depression moved northwestward toward the Southeastern United States. Conditions were not favorable for strengthening, with cool air and minimal outflow, although the cyclone acquired gale-force winds by 12:00 UTC on August 16, becoming a subtropical storm. Shortly thereafter the system's circulation contracted, indicative of a transition to tropical status 12 hours later. An approaching cold front turned the system northeastward on June 18. At 02:00 UTC, the minimal tropical storm moved ashore near Little River Inlet, South Carolina, with winds of 40 mph (64 km/h). Weakening to a depression as it headed inland, the cyclone lost tropical characteristics by 12:00 UTC on June 22. Having transitioned into an extratropical storm, its remnants continued to the northeast, restrengthening slightly to 50 mph (80 km/h) a day later. Early on June 22, the system was absorbed by the front, and continued to the northeast into Nova Scotia. The system dropped locally heavy rainfall, peaking at 8.86 in (225 mm) in North Wilkesboro, North Carolina. In South Carolina, the rains caused flooding near Myrtle Beach, concurrent with 2.5 ft (0.76 m) above-normal tides, which caused $15,000 in damage, mostly to crops. Farther north, the rains were beneficial, with totals as high as 6.71 in (170 mm) in Saco, Maine.

=== Late June tropical storm ===
- Tropical storm (SSHWS)
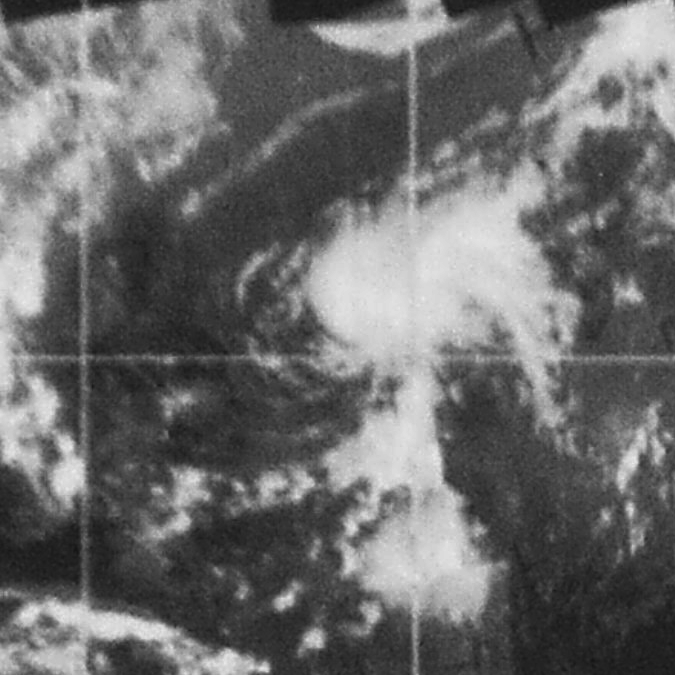
- Duration: June 20 – June 23
- Peak intensity: 50 mph (85 km/h) (1-min); 1006 mbar (hPa)

In mid-June, a lingering trough produced disorganized convection across the eastern Gulf of Mexico and western Atlantic. An area of low pressure developed northeast of Florida and gradually organized into a tropical depression around 00:00 UTC on June 20. Strong westerly shear affected the system, but it intensified into a tropical storm the next day and attained peak winds of 50 mph (80 km/h) as it maintained a small central dense overcast. The system gradually weakened beginning on June 22 and dissipated after 12:00 UTC on June 23 as it moved toward the east.

=== Hurricane Arlene ===
- Category 1 hurricane (SSHWS)
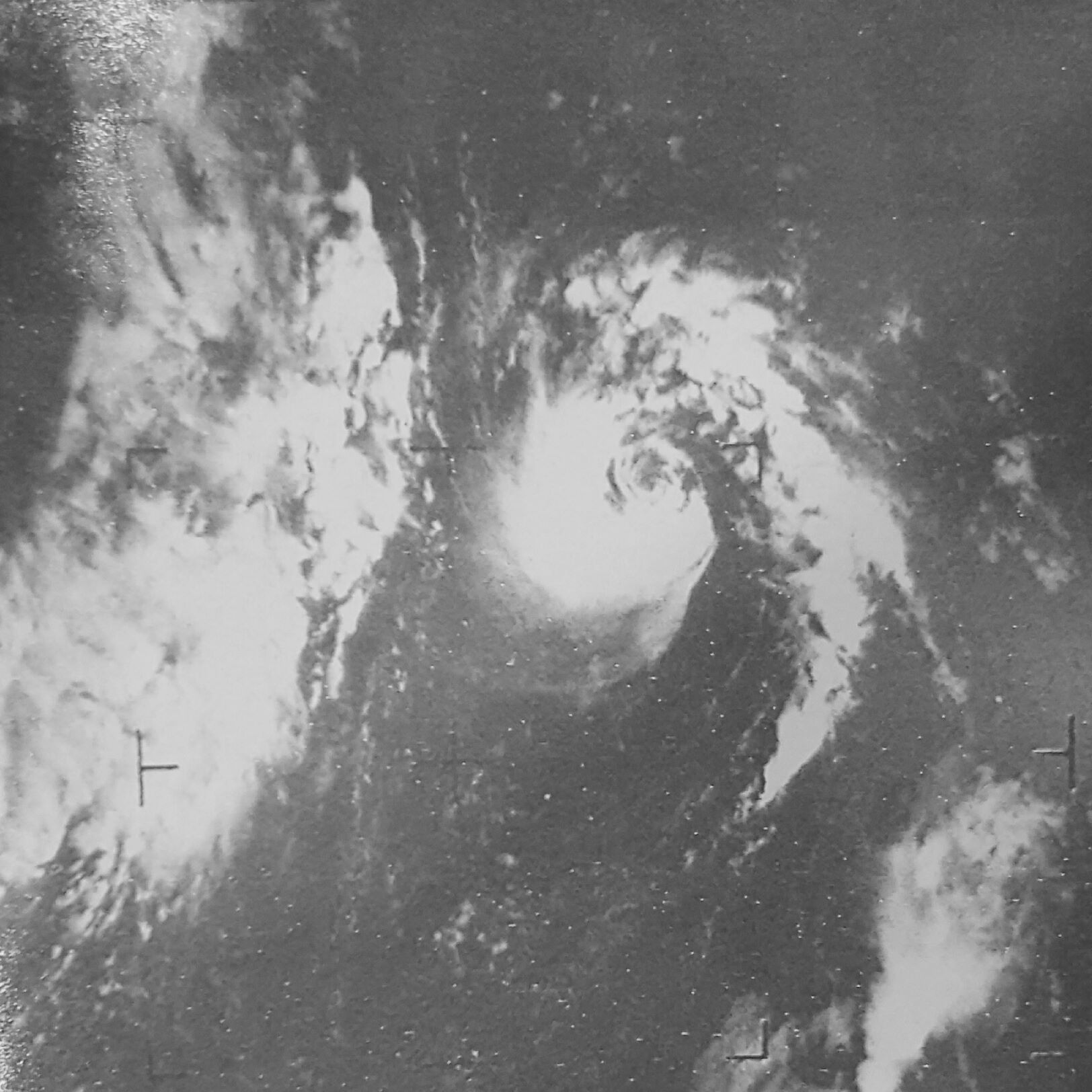
- Duration: August 28 – September 5
- Peak intensity: 90 mph (150 km/h) (1-min); 982 mbar (hPa)

Following a series of weak tropical depressions emerging from the west coast of Africa, the ITCZ became more active at the end of August. A tropical wave exited the coast of Africa on August 24, and by the next day, a Pan American flight observed a circulation with falling pressures. Based on the system's organization on satellite imagery, the NHC assessed that Tropical Depression Five developed late on August 28 about 740 mi (1,190 km) west of Cabo Verde. Steered by a strong ridge to its northeast, the nascent system tracked northwestward, strengthening into a tropical storm by 18:00 UTC on the following day. After two ships reported gale-force winds, the NHC began issuing advisories on Tropical Storm Arlene at 08:00 UTC on August 30. That day, Arlene quickly attained winds of 45 mph (72 km/h). Concomitantly, the Hurricane Hunters observed winds of 70 mph (110 km/h), although the storm was well below hurricane intensity at that time; this was due to Arlene's interaction with the strong ridge.

Arlene failed to intensify much for nearly three days while passing through the Mid-Atlantic upper-level trough, although its wind speeds eventually increased. On September 2, Arlene turned to the north due to an approaching trough moving eastward from the Northeastern United States. Around that time, it began intensifying as it passed about 500 mi (800 km) east of Bermuda. The storm's convection wrapped around the center and organized further as Arlene progressed northward. Turning to the northeast, the storm attained hurricane status by 18:00 UTC. Late on the next day, the Hurricane Hunters recorded a minimum barometric pressure of 982 mbar (29.0 inHg), which, along with the storm's forward speed, suggested maximum sustained winds of 90 mph (140 km/h); together these data would signify Arlene's peak intensity. Soon after, the storm transitioned into an extratropical cyclone, and was absorbed by the trough late on September 5 to the southeast of Newfoundland.

=== Early September tropical storm ===
- Tropical storm (SSHWS)
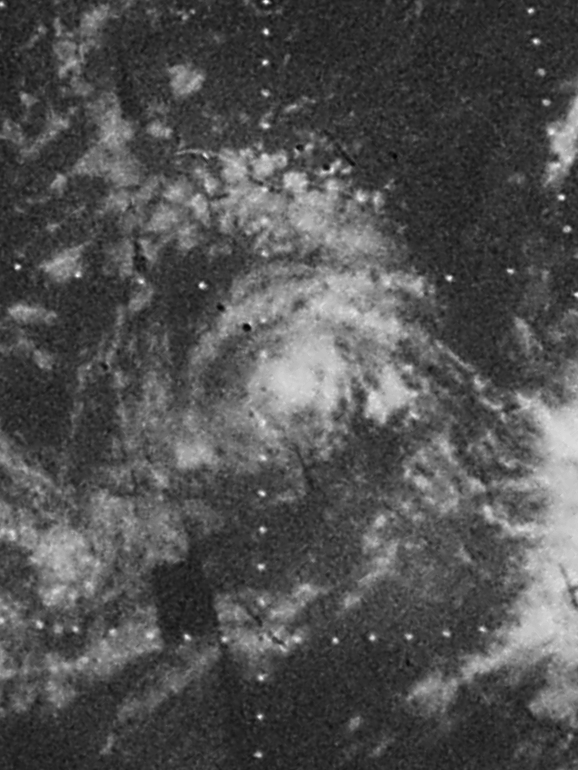
- Duration: September 1 – September 5
- Peak intensity: 40 mph (65 km/h) (1-min); 1004 mbar (hPa)

A tropical wave moved off Africa on August 28, spawning a large area of disorganized convection as it moved west. The system became much better organized on September 1, and it developed into a tropical depression around 12:00 UTC that day. Moving along the Intertropical Convergence Zone, the cyclone further developed into a tropical storm winds of 40 mph (64 km/h) winds on September 3. Satellite imagery showed a compact storm with organized convection near its center. However, it began to weaken on September 4, and it dissipated over the central Atlantic after 18:00 UTC on September 5. The remnants of the storm may have been absorbed into the large circulation of Chloe to the east.

=== Hurricane Chloe ===
- Category 2 hurricane (SSHWS)
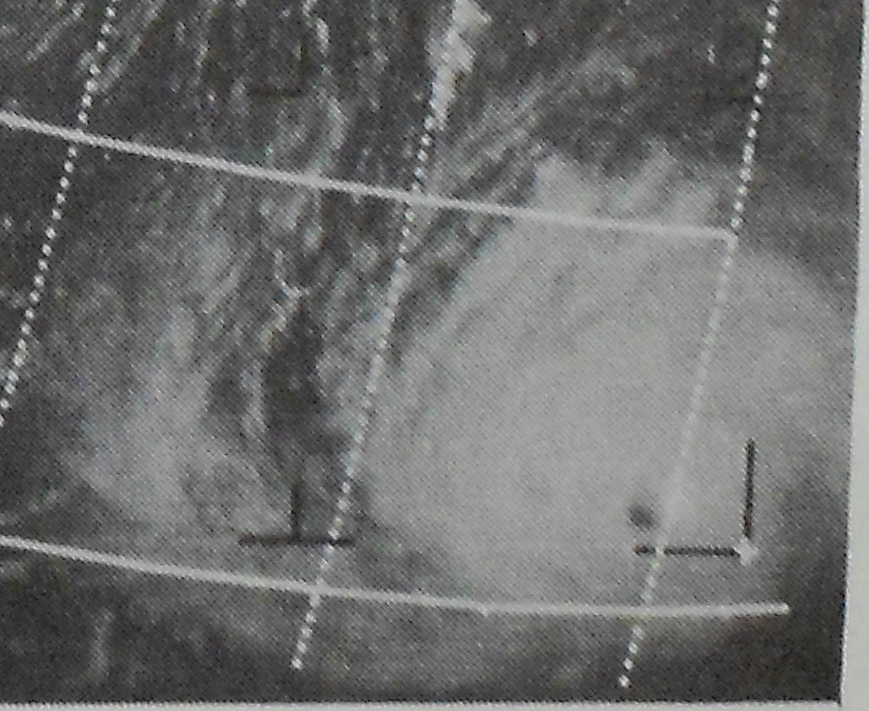
- Duration: September 4 – September 21
- Peak intensity: 110 mph (175 km/h) (1-min); 958 mbar (hPa)

On September 4, a tropical wave exited the west coast of Africa, and by 18:00 UTC organized into Tropical Depression Eight between Cabo Verde and Senegal. Soon after, the depression moved through Cabo Verde, and it continued northwestward due to a passing mid-latitude trough. On September 6, the depression intensified into Tropical Storm Chloe, but its intensity stabilized for the next three days. On September 9, intensification resumed, and the Hurricane Hunters visually observed winds of 86 mph (138 km/h); though these were judged to be too high, Chloe's winds neared hurricane status. Maintaining intensity over the following day, Chloe turned sharply westward. By 12:00 UTC on September 11 Chloe attained hurricane status; around that time interaction with Hurricane Doria to the west turned Chloe more toward the northwest. Little more than a day later, Chloe peaked with winds of 110 mph (180 km/h), and subsequently reached its minimum pressure of 958 mbar (28.3 inHg), as documented by reconnaissance aircraft. Due to the sparse observations in the area, it is possible that Chloe briefly reached major hurricane intensity, but data were insufficient for such an upgrade.

After maintaining peak winds for about 48 hours, Chloe weakened somewhat early on September 15, while still over the open waters of the east-central Atlantic Ocean. By 12:00 UTC the cyclone briefly dipped below Category 2 on the Saffir–Simpson scale, but re-intensified to recover its former status 12 hours later. Over the next three days the westerlies turned Chloe east-northeastward, but the storm maintained winds of 100 mph (160 km/h) during this timeframe. On September 18 the storm was last intercepted by the Hurricane Hunters southeast of Newfoundland. By 12:00 UTC on September 19 Chloe finally began to lose its strength, and a day later degenerated into a tropical storm. Chloe transitioned into an extratropical cyclone containing gales on September 21. On the same date, the extratropical remnants of Chloe reached the coastline of France near Bordeaux and quickly dissipated inland over central France. Off the northern coast of A Coruña, Spain, high waves from Chloe sank the Fiete Schulze – a German cargo ship attempting to circumnavigate the storm. Of the 42 person crew, 14 people drowned, and the others were rescued and brought to a West German hospital, sparking fear of kidnapping from the East German government.

=== Hurricane Beulah ===
- Category 5 hurricane (SSHWS)
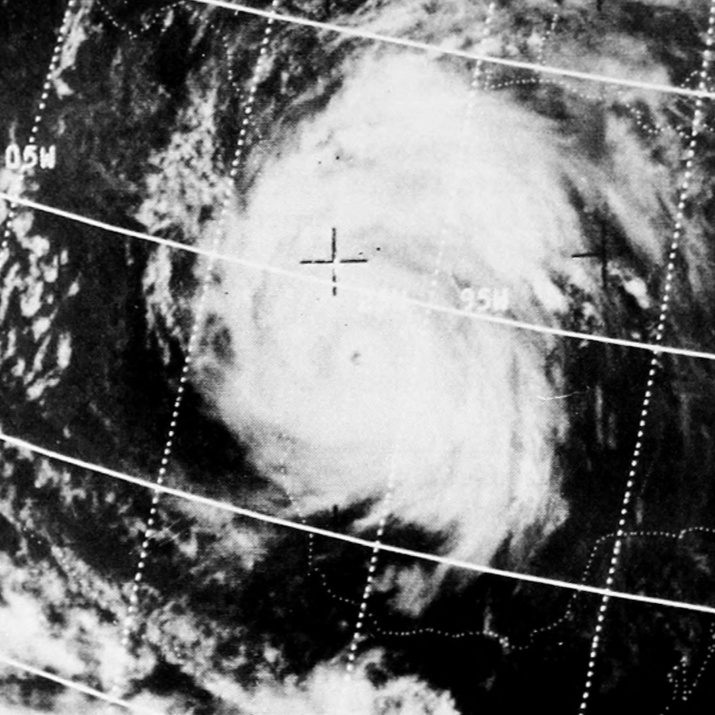
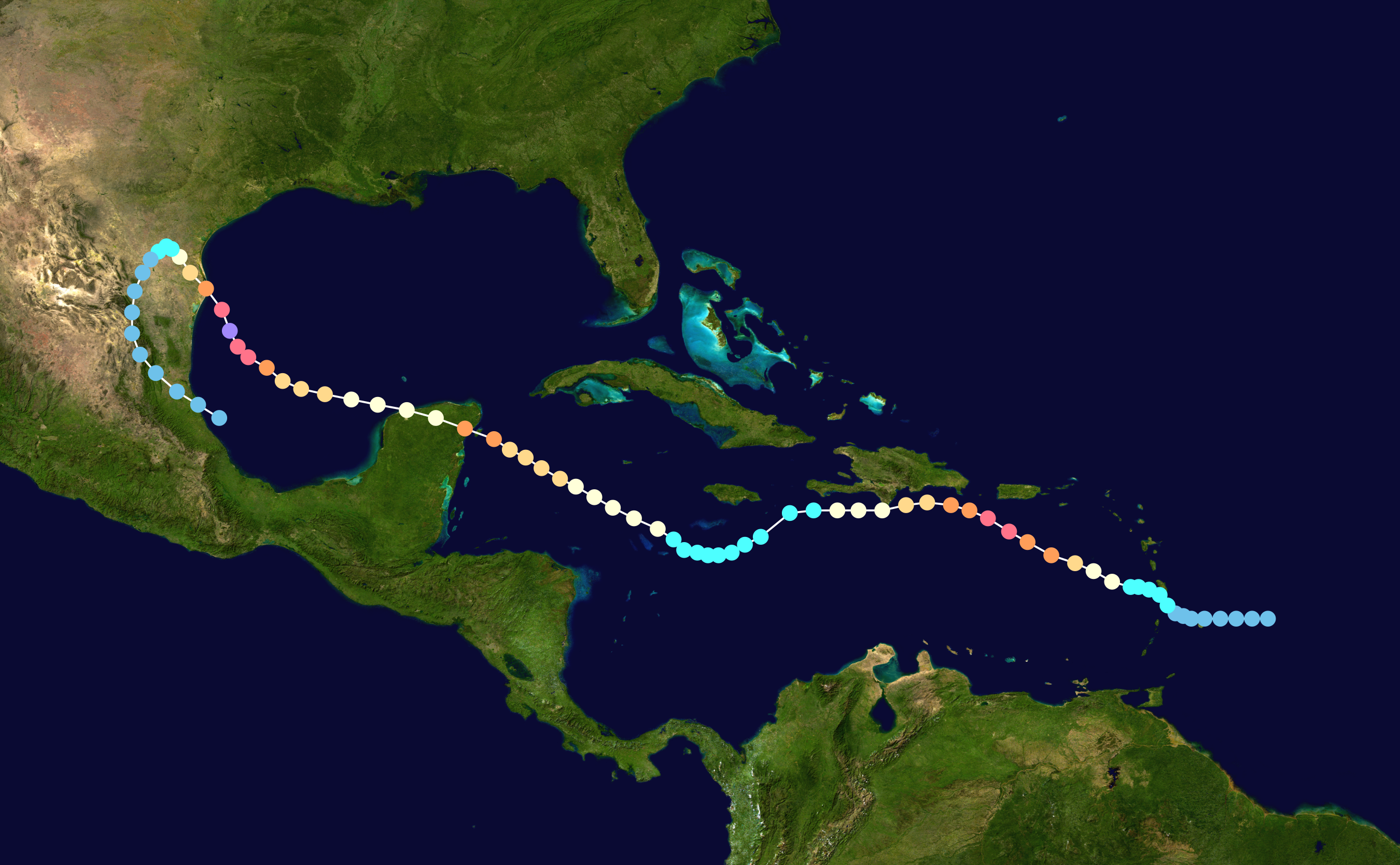
- Duration: September 6 – September 24
- Peak intensity: 160 mph (260 km/h) (1-min); 921 mbar (hPa)

A tropical wave exited the coast of Africa on August 28. Moving westward, it organized into Tropical Depression Seven at 12:00 UTC on September 5, while located about 170 mi (270 km) northeast of Barbados. On September 7, the depression intensified into Tropical Storm Beulah, which crossed into the Caribbean Sea that day. After continued strengthening, Beulah became a hurricane on September 8, and two days later reached an initial peak of 145 mph (233 km/h) to the southwest of Puerto Rico. An anticyclone over the Bahamas turned the hurricane westward, as changing upper-level conditions from a passing trough to the north, as well as land interaction with Hispaniola, greatly weakened Beulah. The track shifted to the southwest and weakened further to a tropical storm.

On September 13, Beulah began a steady track to the northwest while passing south of Jamaica. On the next day, it re-intensified into a hurricane due to favorable conditions, strengthening to a major hurricane by September 17. Continuing to intensify, Beulah impacted Cozumel and later the east coast of the Yucatán Peninsula with winds of 125 mph (201 km/h). After weakening over land, Beulah restrengthened over the warm waters of the Gulf of Mexico, attaining peak winds of 160 mph (260 km/h) early on September 20, making it a Category 5 on the Saffir-Simpson scale. On two aircraft passes about seven hours apart, Hurricane Hunters reported a minimum pressure of 923 mbar (27.3 inHg), the second-lowest aircraft reading at the time after Hurricane Hattie in 1961. The pressure may have been lower between those passes around 00:00 UTC on that day as a result. Beulah weakened slightly before making its final landfall around 12:00 UTC on September 20, just south of the United States–Mexico border, with winds of 125 mph (201 km/h) and an estimated central pressure of 940 mb (28 inHg). It weakened quickly over land and stalled near Alice, Texas, before turning to the southwest over Nuevo León on September 22.

On Martinique, Beulah dropped 18.7 in (475 mm) of rainfall in Les Anses-d'Arlet. Flooding rains damaged roads, bridges, and houses on Martinique and neighboring Saint Lucia. In the Lesser Antilles, Beulah caused $7.65 million in damage and 17 deaths. The storm caused minor damage and one death in southern Puerto Rico. After the severe impacts of Hurricane Inez a year prior, about 200,000 people evacuated the southern coast of the Dominican Republic. There, Beulah left heavy damage to roads, bridges, and the banana and coffee crops, but the evacuations led to a low death toll of two in the nation. Minor water damage occurred along Haiti's southern Tiburon Peninsula. On Cozumel, Beulah's strong winds destroyed 40% of the houses and heavily damaged many hotels, severely impacting the tourism industry. Along the northern Yucatán Peninsula, the winds wrecked a clock tower in Tizimín, killing five. Beulah dropped heavy rainfall in southern Texas and northeastern Mexico, peaking at 27.38 in (695 mm) in Pettus, Texas. The rains caused record river flooding, with a peak crest of 53.4 ft (16.3 m) along the San Antonio River at Goliad. In northeastern Mexico, Beulah killed 19 people, left 100,000 people homeless, and caused $26.9 million in damage. In Texas, damage reached $200 million, and there were 15 deaths, 5 of whom related to a then-record-breaking tornado outbreak that generated 115 tornadoes.

=== Hurricane Doria ===
- Category 2 hurricane (SSHWS)
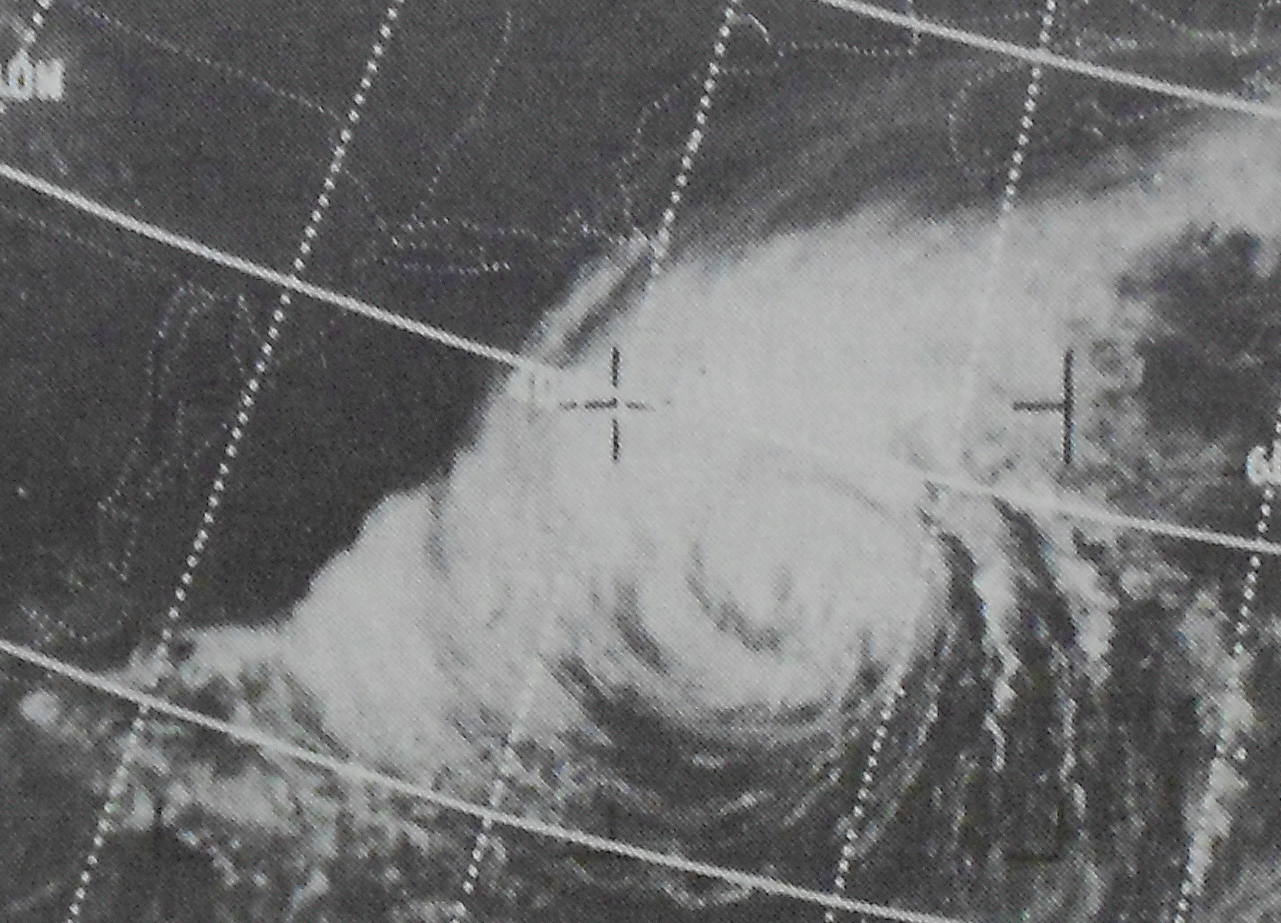
- Duration: September 4 – September 21
- Peak intensity: 100 mph (155 km/h) (1-min); 973 mbar (hPa)

A decaying cold front led to Subtropical Storm Nine developing on September 6 off the Southeastern United States. Containing winds of 45 mph (72 km/h), it weakened to a subtropical depression on the following day, and drifted to the west-southwest before turning sharply to the northeast on September 9. That day it intensified into Tropical Storm Doria, becoming a hurricane with winds of 80 mph (130 km/h) on September 10 while 200 mi (320 km) east of the Florida–Georgia border. It briefly weakened to a tropical storm on September 11, but by the next day had already re-strengthened into a hurricane. Doria attained peak winds of 100 mph (160 km/h) on September 14, after which a ridge over New England turned the storm westward. On September 16, the hurricane weakened to tropical storm status to the south of New Jersey. At 00:00 UTC on September 17, Doria made landfall near Virginia Beach, Virginia, with winds of 60 mph (97 km/h), and it later turned southward, re-emerging into the Atlantic Ocean east of Cape Lookout as a tropical depression. It then crossed over its former path before turning eastward, dissipating on September 21 southwest of Bermuda. Doria left $150,000 in minor coastal damage and killed three people when capsizing a boat offshore Ocean City, New Jersey.

=== Late September tropical storm ===
- Tropical storm (SSHWS)
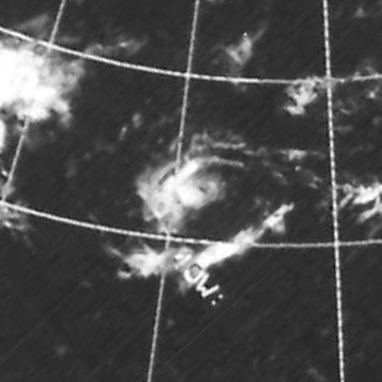
- Duration: September 25 – October 1
- Peak intensity: 45 mph (75 km/h) (1-min); 1004 mbar (hPa)

A convectively active tropical wave moved off the western coast of Africa on September 22. It tracked westward, remaining disorganized until September 25, when it developed into a tropical depression around 00:00 UTC. The small system harbored organized convection over its center, which was the basis for upgrading it to a tropical storm on September 27. The next day, it reached peak winds of 45 mph (72 km/h). By September 30, the storm began to become less organized while it slowed in forward motion, a trend that caused the cyclone to dissipate after 12:00 UTC on October 1.

=== Tropical Storm Edith ===
- Tropical storm (SSHWS)
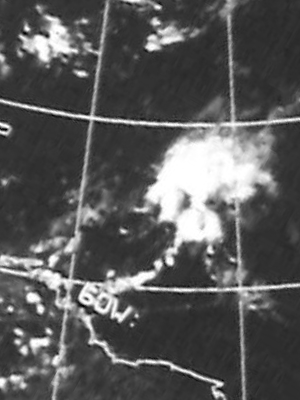
- Duration: September 26 – October 1
- Peak intensity: 50 mph (85 km/h) (1-min); 1000 mbar (hPa)

A tropical disturbance moved westward from the African coast on September 20. On September 26, satellite imagery and ship observations indicated that a tropical depression about 830 mi (1,340 km) east of Barbados. At 21:00 UTC, the NHC issued their first advisory, naming the system Edith. A nearby ship reported 16 ft (4.9 m) waves on September 27, potentially indicating stronger winds during periods without meteorological observations, although unfavorable conditions prevented initial development. It was not until 12:00 UTC that Edith attained tropical storm force winds. Twelve hours later, the storm reached peak winds of 60 mph (97 km/h), a trend that spurred hurricane watches from Dominica northward through the Leeward Islands. The storm failed to intensify due to its proximity to a cold upper-level trough and releasing too much latent heat. On September 30, Edith passed over Dominica as a weakened tropical storm and dissipated the next day over the eastern Caribbean Sea. It caused gusty winds and minor damage during its passage through the Lesser Antilles.

=== Hurricane Fern ===
- Category 1 hurricane (SSHWS)
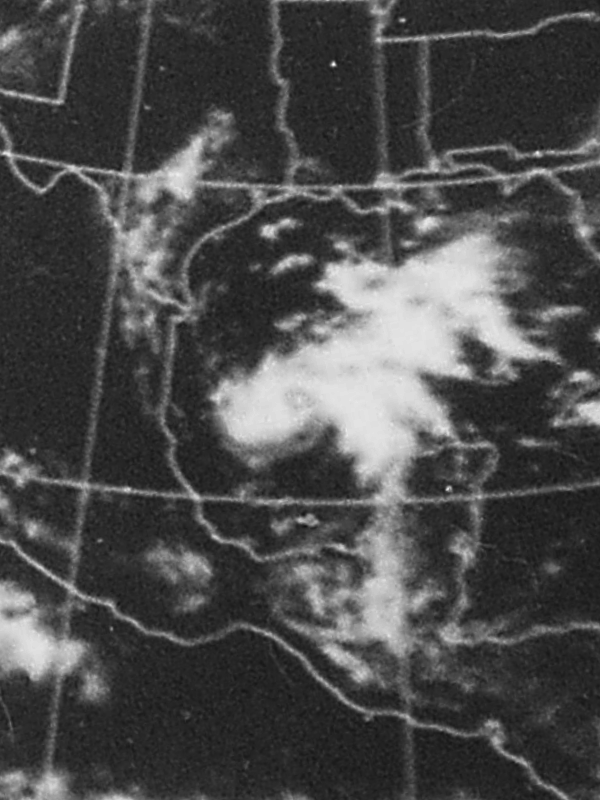
- Duration: October 1 – October 4
- Peak intensity: 75 mph (120 km/h) (1-min); 987 mbar (hPa)

Toward the end of September, a powerful cold front moved through the Gulf of Mexico and stalled over the Bay of Campeche. Convection persisted across the region as the surface pressure dropped. Satellite imagery suggested that Tropical Depression Fourteen developed on October 1 about 140 mi (230 km) northwest of Ciudad del Carmen. As the system organized more, it tracked northward, although a ridge to the north steered the nascent system to the west. On October 2, the British ship Plainsman observed gale-force winds, prompting the NHC to upgrade the depression to Tropical Storm Fern. A small system, the storm intensified further to hurricane status on October 3, reaching peak winds of 85 mph (137 km/h) and a minimum barometric pressure of 987 mbar (29.1 inHg). Upwelling and cold air left in the wake of Hurricane Beulah caused Fern to weaken slightly as it approached the Gulf Coast of Mexico. Around 06:00 UTC on October 4, Fern made landfall about 30 mi (48 km) north of Tampico, Tamaulipas, possibly having weakened to a tropical storm. It rapidly weakened over land, dissipating by 18:00 UTC.

Fern's landfall was accompanied by an area of heavy rainfall that extended into the mountainous areas of Veracruz. The rains caused additional flooding along the Pánuco River, which became swollen during Hurricane Beulah two weeks prior. Three people drowned in the floodwaters. Damage was minor related to Fern. Along the lower Texas coast, the threat from Fern spurred high tide and small craft warnings from the National Weather Service. Additional members of the Texas National Guard, in place after Beulah, were activated due to the threat from Fern.

=== Tropical Storm Ginger ===
- Tropical storm (SSHWS)
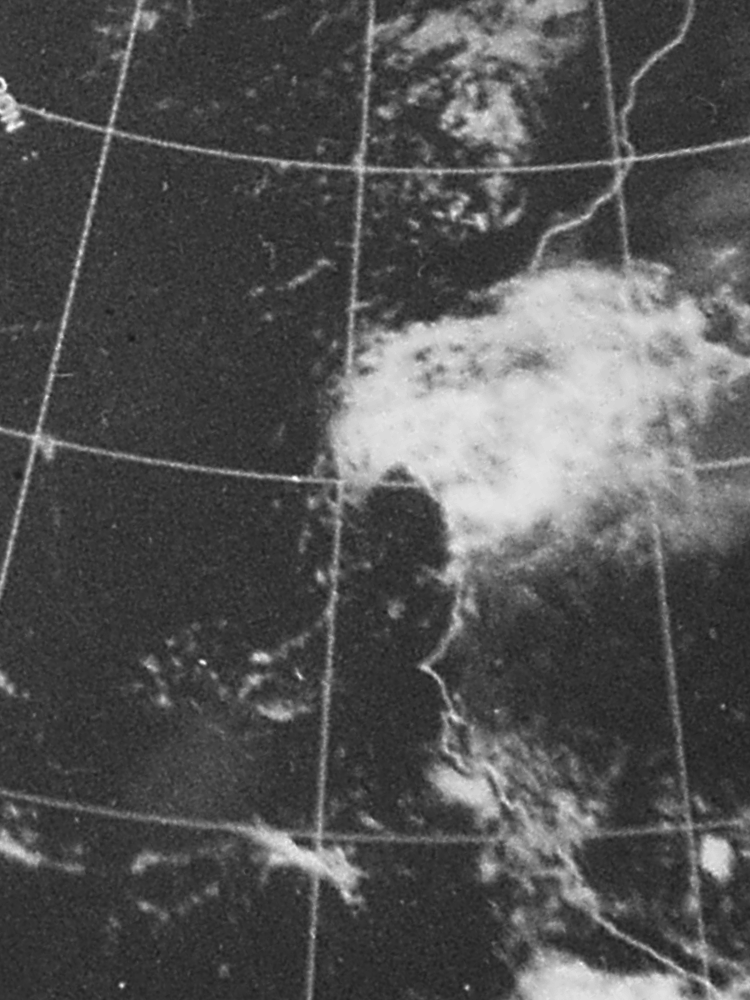
- Duration: October 5 – October 8
- Peak intensity: 50 mph (85 km/h) (1-min); 1007 mbar (hPa)

An area of convection developed off the west coast of Africa following the westward passage of Tropical Depression Sixteen. On October 5, it is estimated that Tropical Depression Seventeen developed from this system, based on the convective appearance on satellite imagery. Three ships reported 40 to 45 mph (64 to 72 km/h) winds on October 6, which was the basis for the NHC upgrading it to Tropical Storm Ginger, in conjunction with data from Cabo Verde. At the time, the storm was located about 400 mi (640 km) north-northwest of Dakar, Senegal, well east of 35° W where the NHC began issuing formal tropical cyclone advisories. Instead, the Rota, Spain Naval Fleet Station issued gale warnings in relation to the storm. Later on October 6, it was estimated that Ginger reached peak winds of 50 mph (80 km/h) and a minimum barometric pressure of 1,007 mbar (29.7 inHg). On October 7, the storm curved west-southwestward and quickly weakened into a tropical depression. Ginger dissipated on October 8 to the north of Cabo Verde.

=== October tropical storm ===
- Tropical storm (SSHWS)
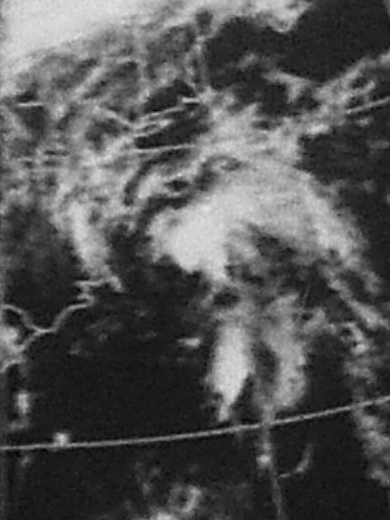
- Duration: October 14 – October 19
- Peak intensity: 60 mph (95 km/h) (1-min); 1002 mbar (hPa)

A tropical wave moved through the northeastern Caribbean on October 10, with a large area of associated thunderstorms. The wave interacted with a stalled frontal boundary, developing a broad circulation by October 13 to the northeast of the Bahamas. A day later, the system developed into a subtropical storm – its classification was because the system was co-located with a trough. There was another area of convection along the front northeast of the subtropical storm, which accelerated northeastward. Meanwhile, the subtropical storm turned westward. It had a small circulation with thunderstorms sheared north of the center, which gradually became more organized. On October 17, an approaching front turned the storm northward and later northeastward. On the same day, the subtropical storm transitioned into a tropical cyclone. On the next day, the storm attained peak winds of 60 mph (97 km/h), before it transitioned into an extratropical cyclone over Atlantic Canada, where it was ultimately absorbed by the cold front on October 19.

=== Hurricane Heidi ===
- Category 1 hurricane (SSHWS)
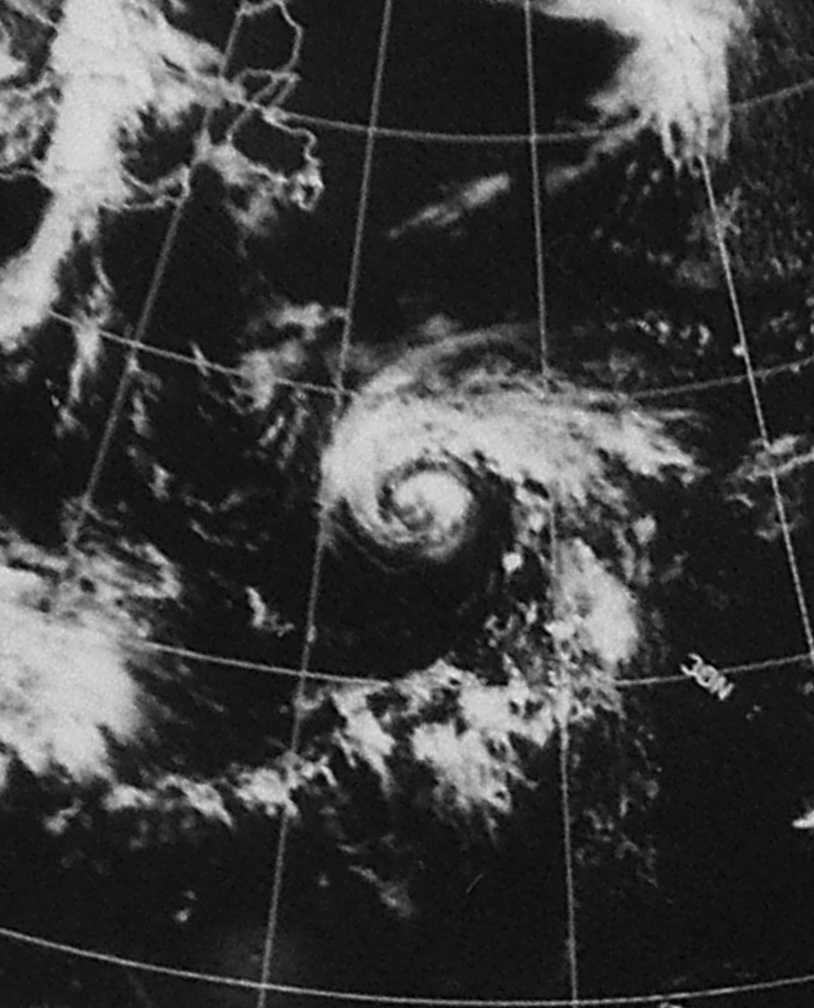
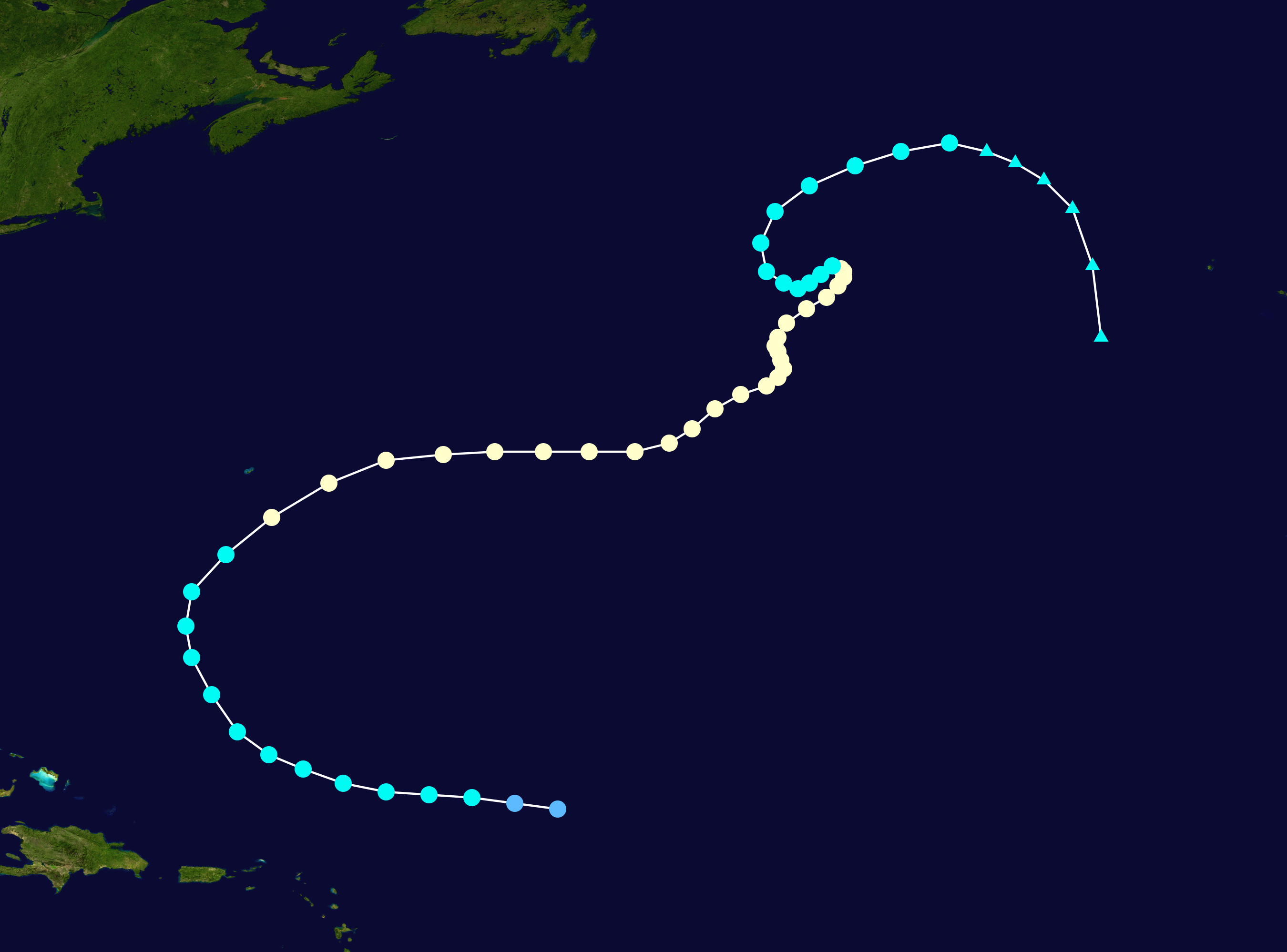
- Duration: October 19 – November 2
- Peak intensity: 85 mph (140 km/h) (1-min); 981 mbar (hPa)

An area of convection persisted on October 16 between the Lesser Antilles and Cabo Verde. It moved west-northwestward for several days, developing into Tropical Depression Twenty-Two on October 19 about 500 mi (800 km) northeast of the Lesser Antilles. The S.S. Sunrana moved through the storm on October 20, reporting winds of 58 mph (93 km/h). At the time, the system was not named due to the lack of a warm thermal core, although it was later assessed as a tropical storm as of 18:00 UTC that day. On October 21, the Hurricane Hunters observed a weak circulation with winds of only 35 mph (56 km/h). At the same time, the storm was located along the edge of a baroclinic zone, which limited strengthening. Curving northeastward due to an approaching trough, the storm intensified more on October 22, as a ship reported winds of 70 mph (110 km/h). That day, data from the Hurricane Hunters observed a warm core, and the NHC classified the system as Tropical Storm Heidi. The storm was more of a hybrid storm initially, with the strongest winds near the center, spurring gale warnings for Bermuda. However, winds there only reached about 15 mph (24 km/h) during the storm's passage.

The NHC initially anticipated that Heidi would become extratropical within two days. Early on October 23, the agency upgraded the storm to hurricane status about 105 mi (175 mi) southeast of Bermuda. Heidi moved quickly eastward with the approaching trough until October 25, when a building ridge caused the hurricane to move slowly northeastward in an area of light wind shear. Early on October 26, Heidi attained peak winds of 90 mph (140 km/h) about halfway between Bermuda and the Azores. By the next day, the hurricane had become much larger, with characteristics of an extratropical storm despite maintaining the warm thermal core. After stalling on October 29, Heidi turned westward and weakened to tropical storm status. Another approaching trough turned the storm back to the northeast on October 31. Later that day, Heidi started losing tropical characteristics, transitioning into an extratropical cyclone by November 1. Later that day, the remnants of Heidi were absorbed into the prevailing weather conditions of the north Atlantic Ocean.

=== Other systems ===
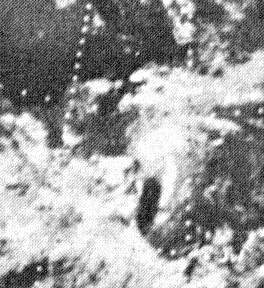
Tropical Depression One over the western Caribbean Sea

There were also five non-developing tropical depressions during the season.

On June 10, Tropical Depression One developed in the western Caribbean Sea, near the Gulf of Honduras. It moved northwestward, dissipating over the eastern Yucatán Peninsula on June 12.

A tropical wave exited Senegal on September 18 and progressing westward near Cabo Verde. A day later, it developed into Tropical Depression Fifteen. It moved across the Atlantic, dissipating on September 27 after entering the eastern Caribbean.

A tropical wave exited Africa on September 25. A day later, it became Tropical Depression Seventeen while moving near Cabo Verde. It dissipated on September 28.

From October 7–10, Tropical Depression Twenty-Two existed in the western Atlantic.

From October 15–17, Tropical Depression Twenty-Four existed in the central Atlantic.

== Storm names ==
The following list of names was used for named storms, of tropical storm and hurricane strength, that formed in the North Atlantic in 1967. Storms were named Chloe, Doria, Fern, Ginger and Heidi for the first time in 1967.

- Arlene
- Beulah
- Chloe
- Doria
- Edith
- Fern
- Ginger
- Heidi
- Irene (unused)
- Janice (unused)
- Kristy (unused)
- Laura (unused)
- Margo (unused)
- Nona (unused)
- Orchid (unused)
- Portia (unused)
- Rachel (unused)
- Sandra (unused)
- Terese (unused)
- Verna (unused)
- Wallis (unused)

=== Retirement ===
The name Beulah was retired following the 1967 season, and will never be used for an Atlantic tropical cyclone again. It was replaced with Beth for the 1971 season.

== Season effects ==
This is a table of all of the tropical cyclones that formed in the 1967 Atlantic hurricane season. It includes their name, duration, peak classification and intensities, areas affected, damage, and death totals. Deaths in parentheses are additional and indirect (an example of an indirect death would be a traffic accident), but were still related to that storm. Damage and deaths include totals while the storm was extratropical, a wave, or a low, and all of the damage figures are in 1967 USD.

Saffir–Simpson scale
TD	TS	C1	C2	C3	C4	C5

1967 Atlantic hurricane season statistics
Storm name	Dates active	Storm category at peak intensity	Max 1-min wind mph (km/h)	Min. press. (mbar)	Areas affected	Damage (US$)	Deaths	Ref(s).
One	June 10–12	Tropical depression	30 (50)	Unknown	Yucatán Peninsula	None	None	
Unnamed	June 15–19	Tropical storm	40 (65)	1006	The Bahamas, East Coast of the United States, Atlantic Canada	$15,000	None	
Unnamed	June 20–23	Tropical storm	50 (85)	1006	None	None	None	
Arlene	August 28 – September 5	Category 1 hurricane	90 (150)	982	Newfoundland	None	None	
Unnamed	September 1–5	Tropical storm	40 (65)	1004	None	None	None	
Chloe	September 4–21	Category 2 hurricane	110 (175)	958	Cape Verde, Spain, France	Unknown	14	
Beulah	September 6–24	Category 5 hurricane	160 (260)	921	Greater Antilles, Yucatán Peninsula, Northeast Mexico, South Texas	$234.6 million	59	
Doria	September 4–21	Category 2 hurricane	100 (155)	973	East Coast of the United States	$150,000	3	
Fifteen	September 19–27	Tropical depression	30 (50)	Unknown	None	None	None	
Unnamed	September 25 – October 1	Tropical storm	45 (75)	1004	None	None	None	
Seventeen	September 25–28	Tropical depression	30 (50)	Unknown	None	None	None	
Edith	September 26 – October 1	Tropical storm	60 (95)	1000	Lesser Antilles	Minimal	None	
Fern	October 1–4	Category 1 hurricane	85 (140)	987	Mexico, Texas	Minimal	3	
Ginger	October 5–8	Tropical storm	50 (85)	1002	Senegal, Cape Verde	None	None	
Twenty-Two	October 7–10	Tropical depression	30 (50)	Unknown	None	None	None	
Unnamed	October 14–19	Tropical storm	60 (95)	1002	The Bahamas, Atlantic Canada	None	None	
Twenty-Four	October 15–17	Tropical depression	30 (50)	Unknown	None	None	None	
Heidi	October 19 – November 2	Category 1 hurricane	90 (150)	981	Bermuda	Minimal	None	
Season aggregates
18 systems	June 10 – November 2		160 (260)	923		$235 million	79	

== See also ==
- 1967 Pacific hurricane season
- 1967 Pacific typhoon season
- Australian region cyclone seasons: 1966–67 1967–68
- South Pacific cyclone seasons: 1966–67 1967–68
- South-West Indian Ocean cyclone seasons: 1966–67 1967–68
