= 1967 Pacific hurricane season =

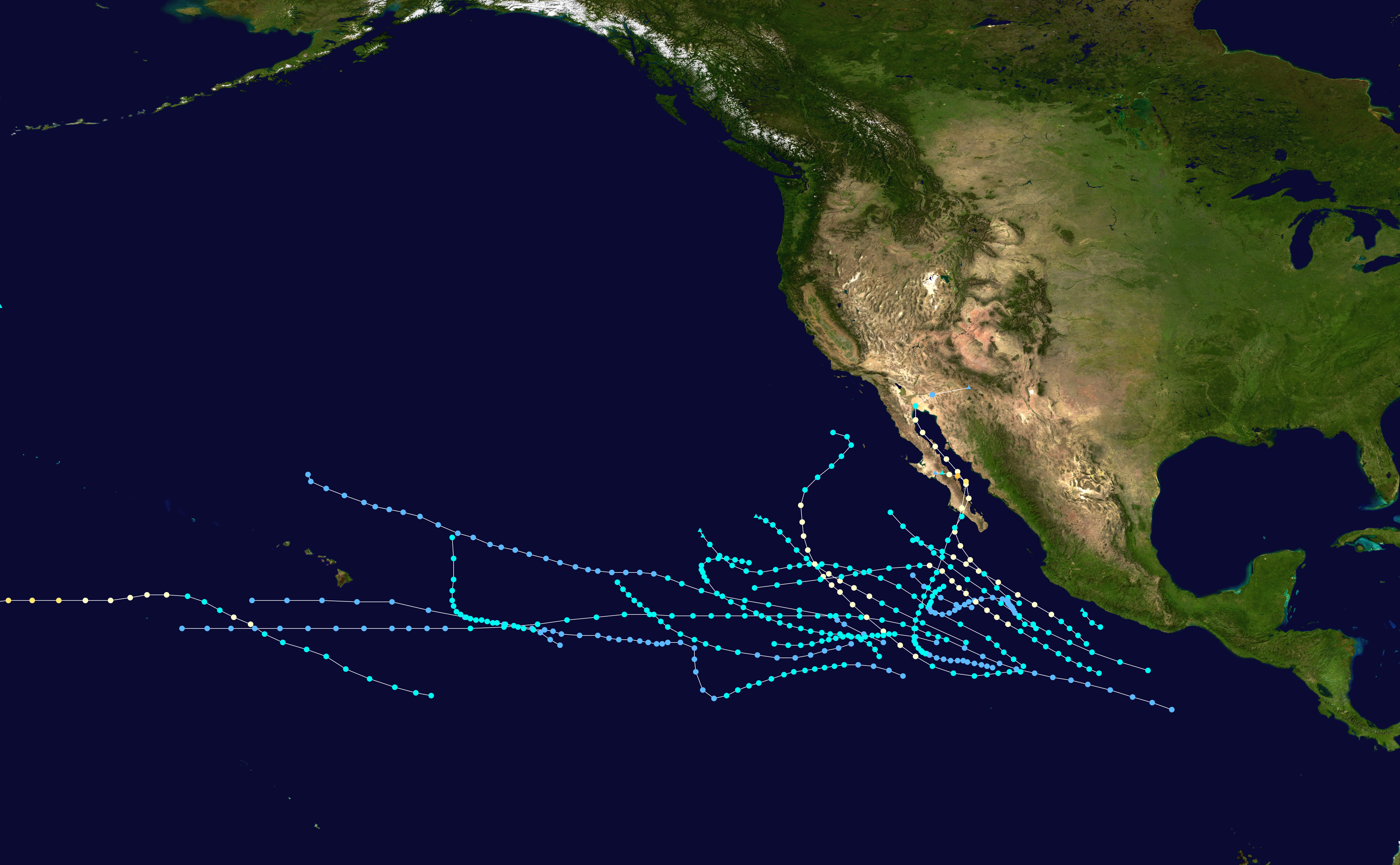
- Season summary map

Seasonal boundaries
- First system formed: May 18, 1967
- Last system dissipated: November 3, 1967

Strongest storm
- Name: Olivia
  - Maximum winds: 125 mph (205 km/h) (1-minute sustained)
  - Lowest pressure: 939 mbar (hPa; 27.73 inHg)

Seasonal statistics
- Total depressions: 17
- Total storms: 17
- Hurricanes: 6
- Major hurricanes (Cat. 3+): 1
- Total fatalities: 121
- Total damage: Unknown

Related articles
- 1967 Atlantic hurricane season; 1967 Pacific typhoon season; 1967 North Indian Ocean cyclone season

The 1967 Pacific hurricane season started on June 1 and ended on November 30, 1967. The season was of little note except for Hurricanes Katrina and Olivia. Katrina made landfall on the Baja Peninsula, killing at least one and made 2,500 homeless. Olivia made landfall on the eastern side of the Baja Peninsula as a major hurricane—only one of two storms ever to do so. Hurricane/Typhoon Sarah formed in the Central Pacific and reached category 1 strength before crossing over to the Western Pacific.

== Systems ==
=== Tropical Depression One ===
- Tropical depression (SSHWS)
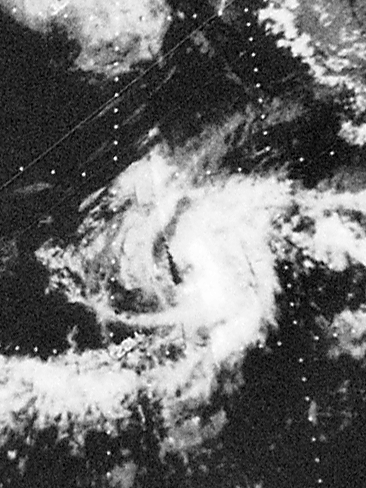
- Duration: May 18 – May 19
- Peak intensity: 30 mph (45 km/h) (1-min);

On May 18, the first tropical depression of the season formed. It remained weak and dissipated the next day far out at sea.

=== Tropical Storm Agatha ===
- Tropical storm (SSHWS)
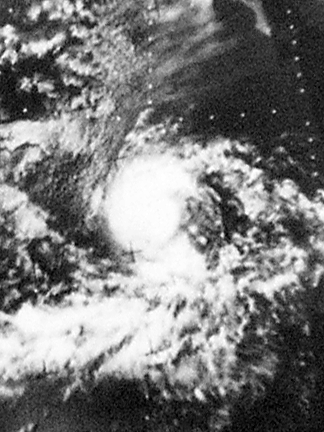
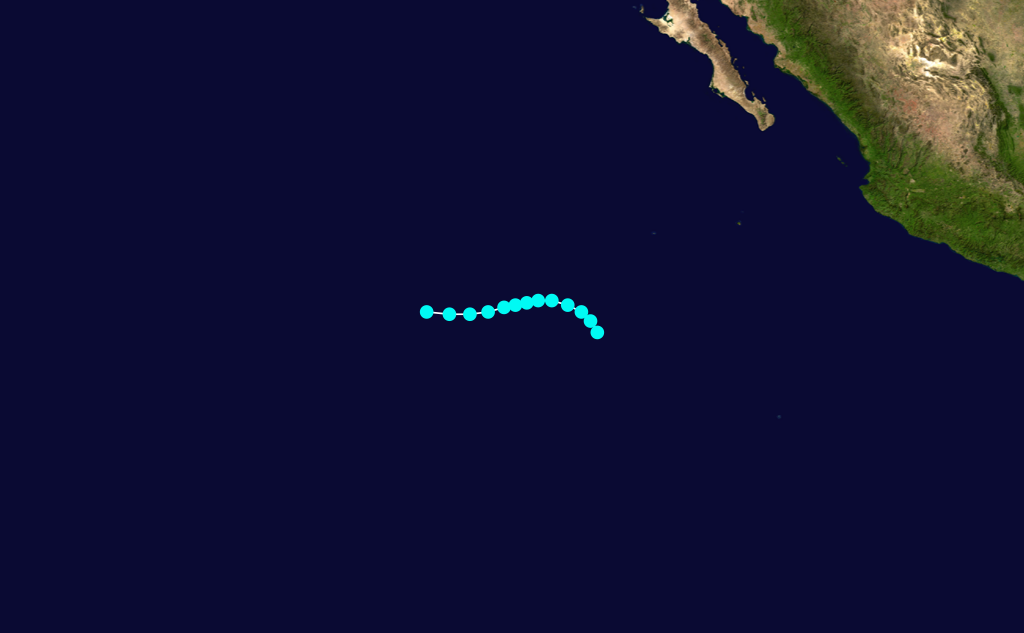
- Duration: June 7 – June 10
- Peak intensity: 50 mph (85 km/h) (1-min);

The first tropical storm of the season formed on June 7 at peak intensity far off from any landmass. It remained at peak intensity until it was stopped being tracked on the 10th.

=== Tropical Storm Bridget ===
- Tropical storm (SSHWS)
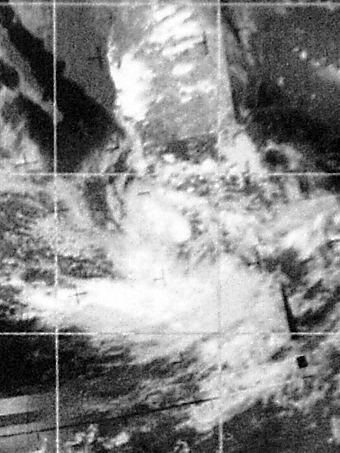
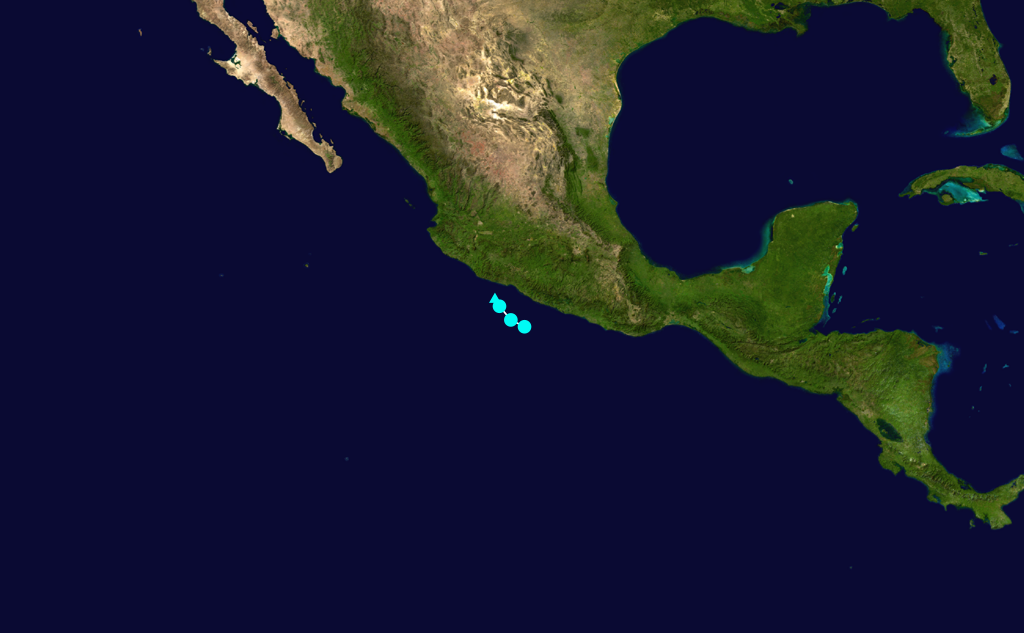
- Duration: June 16 – June 16
- Peak intensity: 45 mph (75 km/h) (1-min);

On June 16, a tropical storm was identified south of Mexico with winds of 45 mph (72 km/h). It weakened as it approached the Mexican mainland and dissipated later that day.

=== Hurricane Carlotta ===
- Category 1 hurricane (SSHWS)
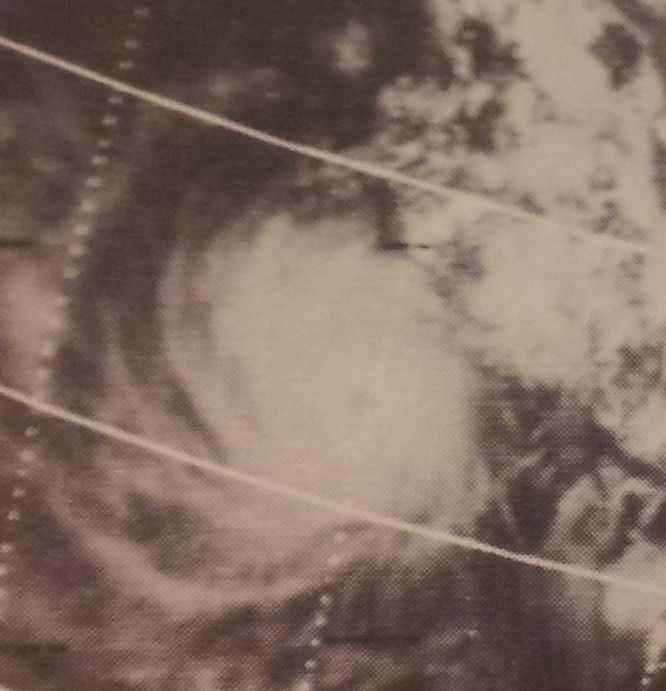
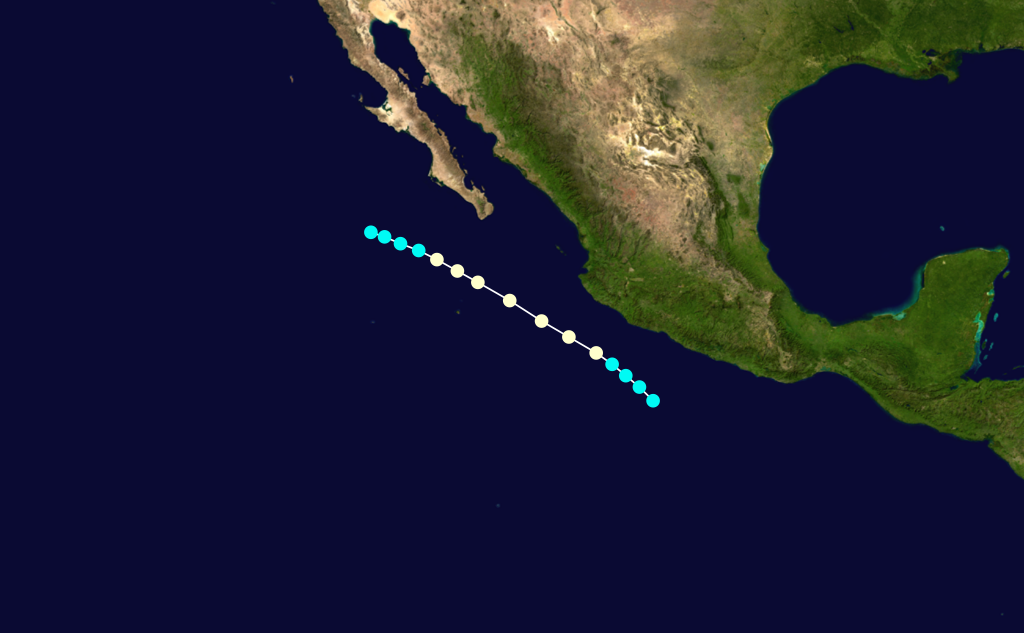
- Duration: June 23 – June 26
- Peak intensity: 85 mph (140 km/h) (1-min);

The first hurricane of the season, Hurricane Carlotta formed on June 23 near the Mexican coast. The storm gradually strengthened and became the next day. The storm stayed as a hurricane until June 25. It rapidly weakened and was stopped being tracked on June 26 south of the Baja Peninsula of Mexico.

=== Tropical Storm Denise ===
- Tropical storm (SSHWS)
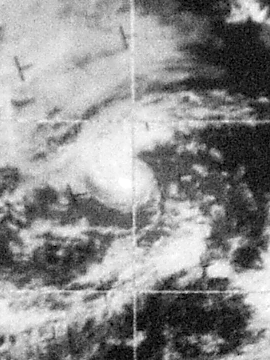
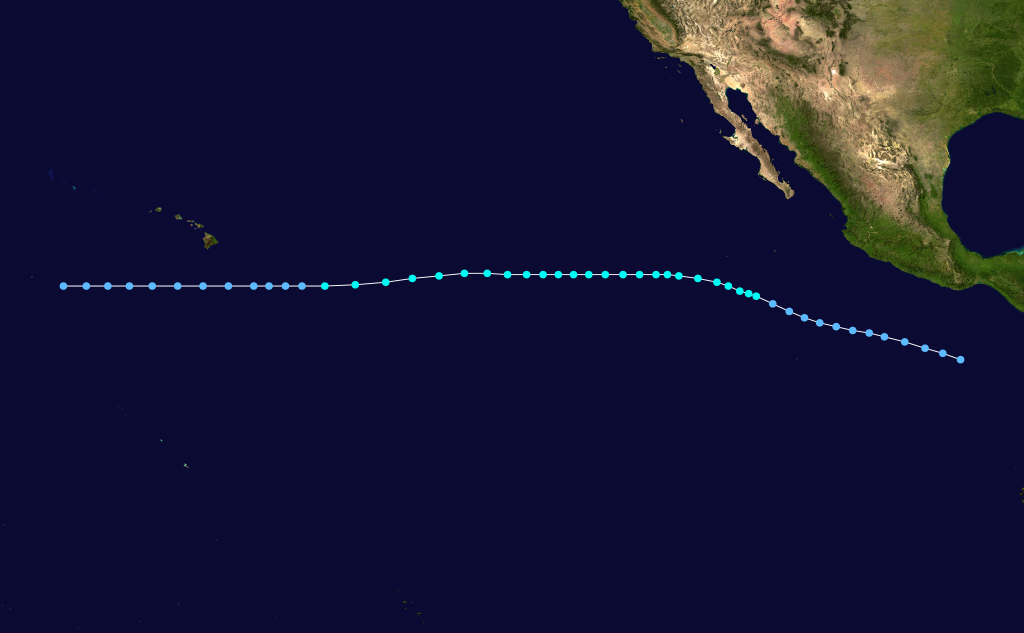
- Duration: July 5 – July 18
- Peak intensity: 50 mph (85 km/h) (1-min);

On July 6, a tropical depression formed south of Mexico. The depression had its origin in a loosely organized area of squalls which had first appeared on satellite photos late on July 5. It strengthened to a tropical storm on the 9th and was named Denise. On July 15, Denise, now in the Central Pacific weakened into a tropical depression. The depression dissipated south-west of Hawaii on July 18, never threatening land.

=== Tropical Storm Eleanor ===
- Tropical storm (SSHWS)
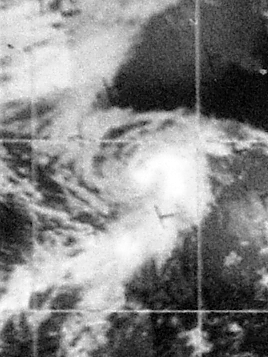
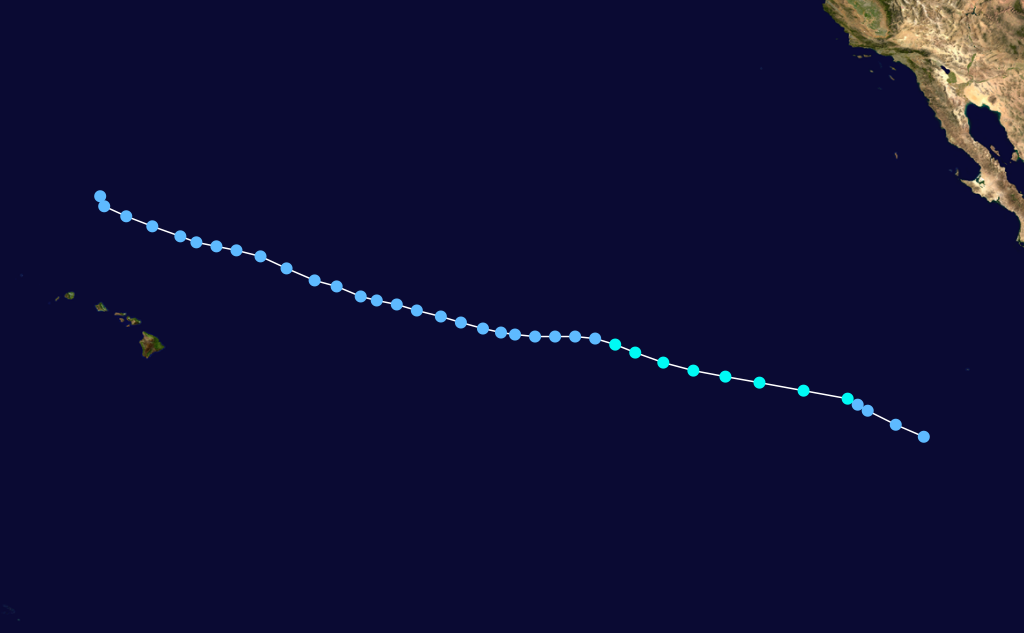
- Duration: July 13 – July 22
- Peak intensity: 65 mph (100 km/h) (1-min);

On June 29, a local hurricane center in Mexico started to track a disturbance off the coast Yucatan, the disturbance remained stationary and unable to develop before it crossed over and slowly moved westwards strengthening to a tropical depression southwest of the Baja Peninsula. It strengthened into a tropical storm late that night and was named Eleanor. It weakened into a tropical depression three days later, on July 16. The depression continued a long journey north-westward until July 22, when it dissipated. Eleanor never threatened land.

=== Tropical Storm Francene ===
- Tropical storm (SSHWS)
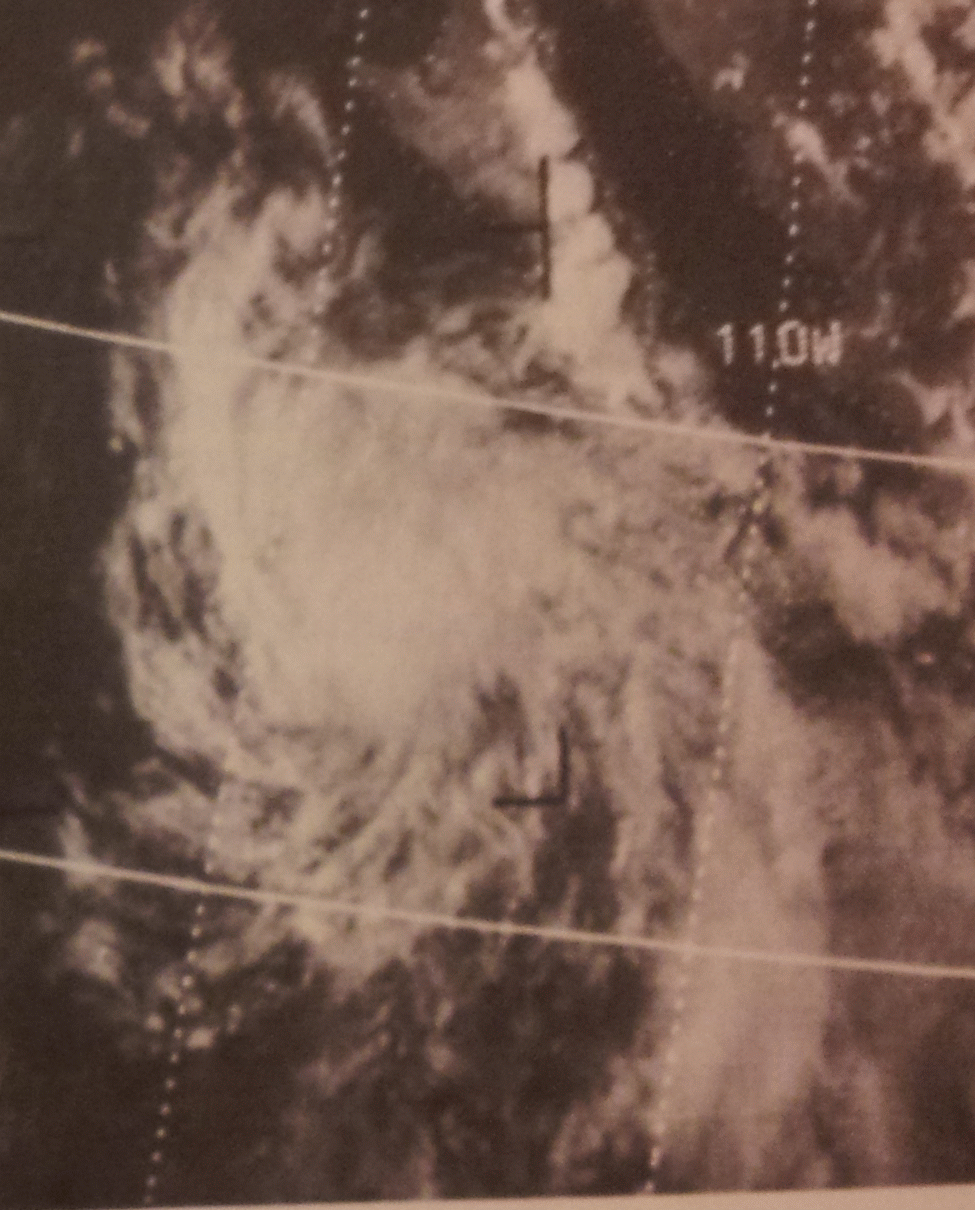
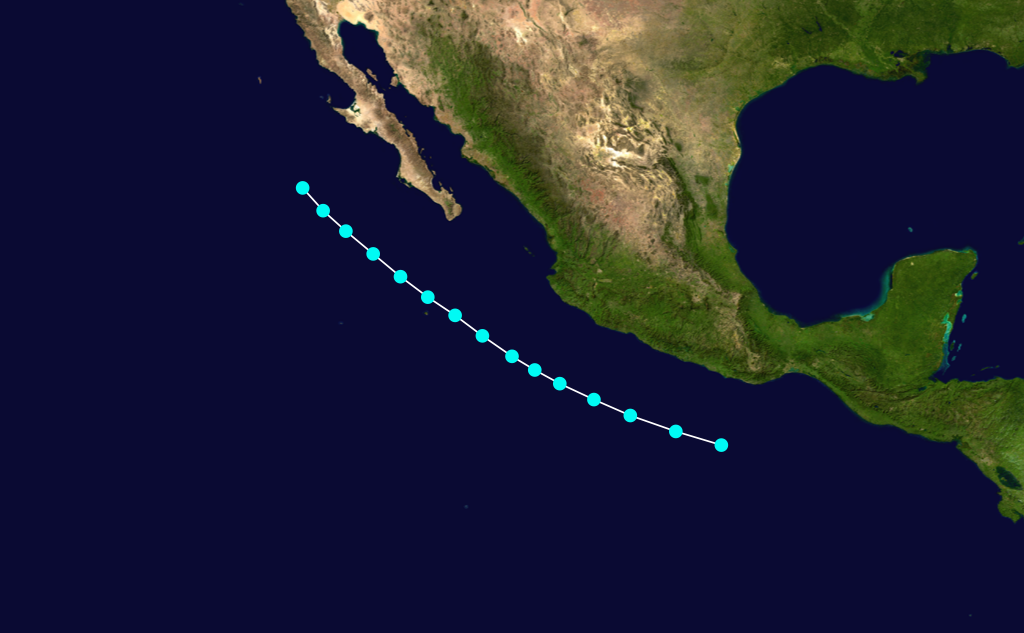
- Duration: July 24 – July 27
- Peak intensity: 50 mph (85 km/h) (1-min); 996 mbar (hPa)

On July 24, the sixth tropical storm of the season was identified relatively close to the Mexican coast. The storm continued a north-westward direction until it dissipated south of the Baja Peninsula.

=== Tropical Storm Georgette ===
- Tropical storm (SSHWS)
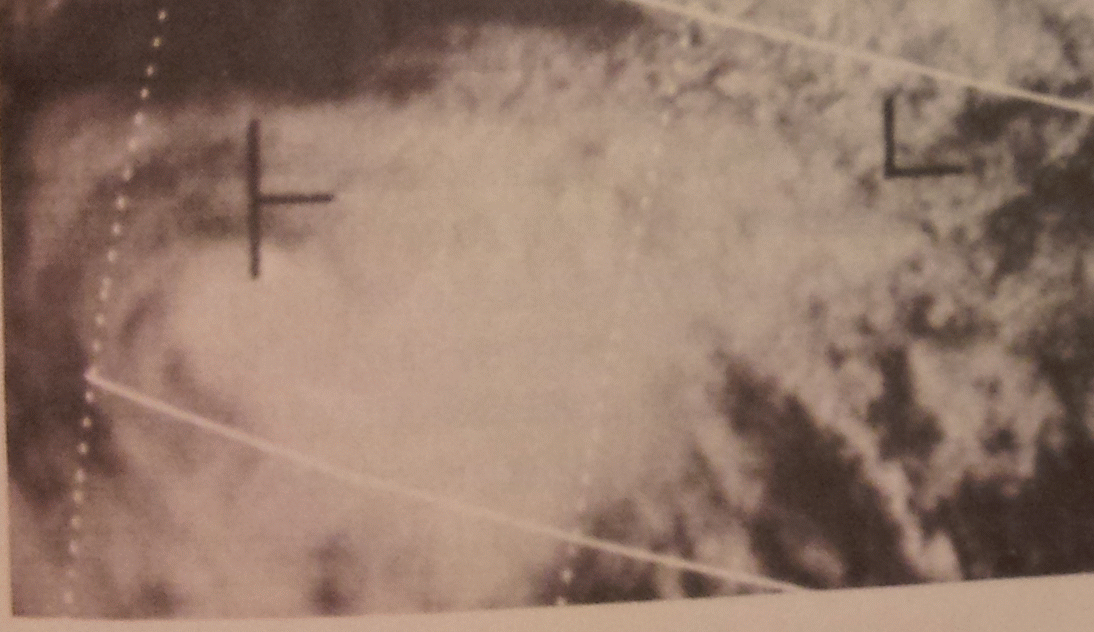
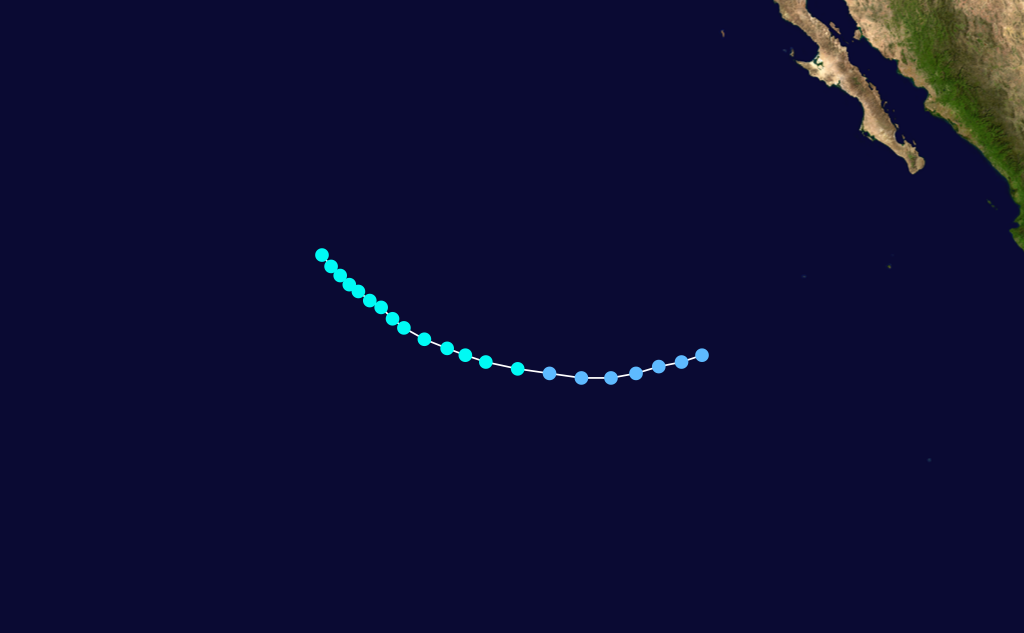
- Duration: July 25 – July 30
- Peak intensity: 50 mph (85 km/h) (1-min); 1006 mbar (hPa)

On July 25, a tropical depression was found far from any landmass. It reached tropical storm strength the next day and was named Georgette. It dissipated on July 30.

=== Tropical Depression Hilary ===
- Tropical depression (SSHWS)
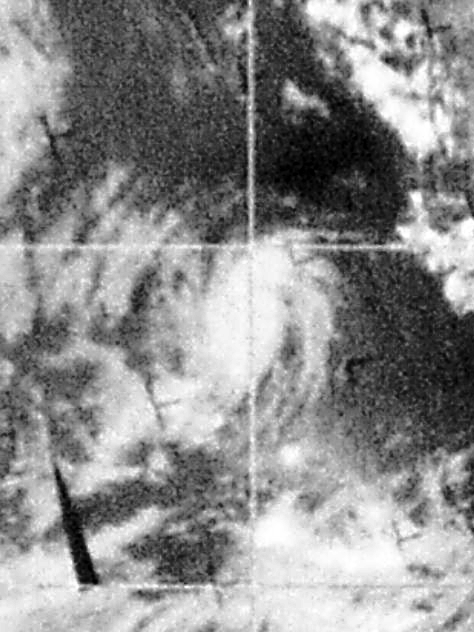
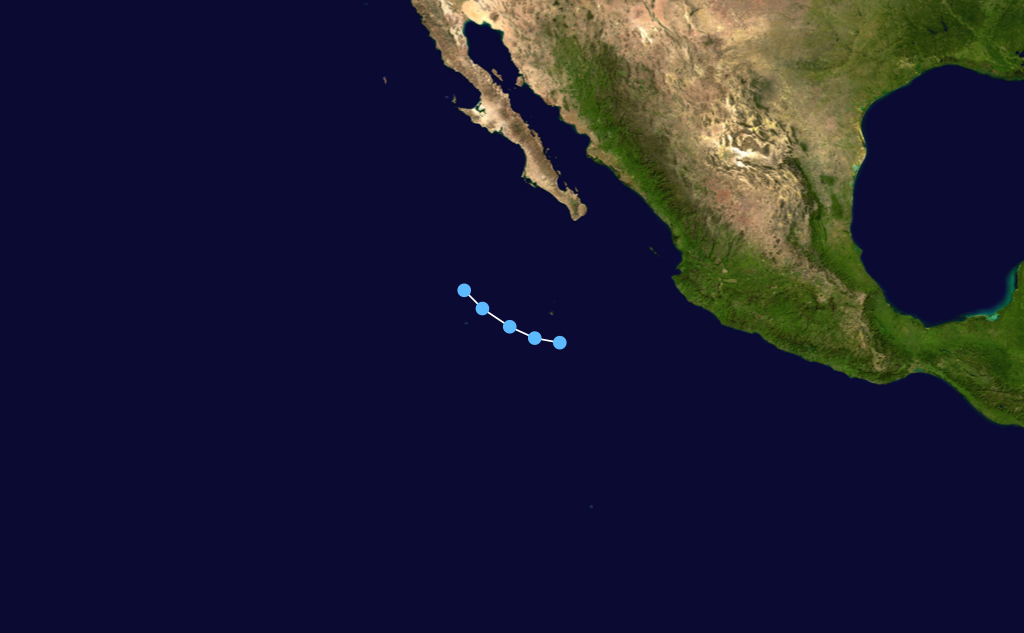
- Duration: August 10 – August 11
- Peak intensity: 30 mph (45 km/h) (1-min);

On August 10, another tropical depression formed south of the Baja California Peninsula. It moved northwestward until it dissipated the next day.

Hilary reportedly attained Tropical Storm strength, however the system's best track by the NHC does support the strength, and in post-storm analysis, Hilary was downgraded into a depression.

=== Tropical Storm Ilsa ===
- Tropical storm (SSHWS)
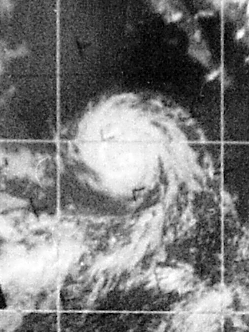
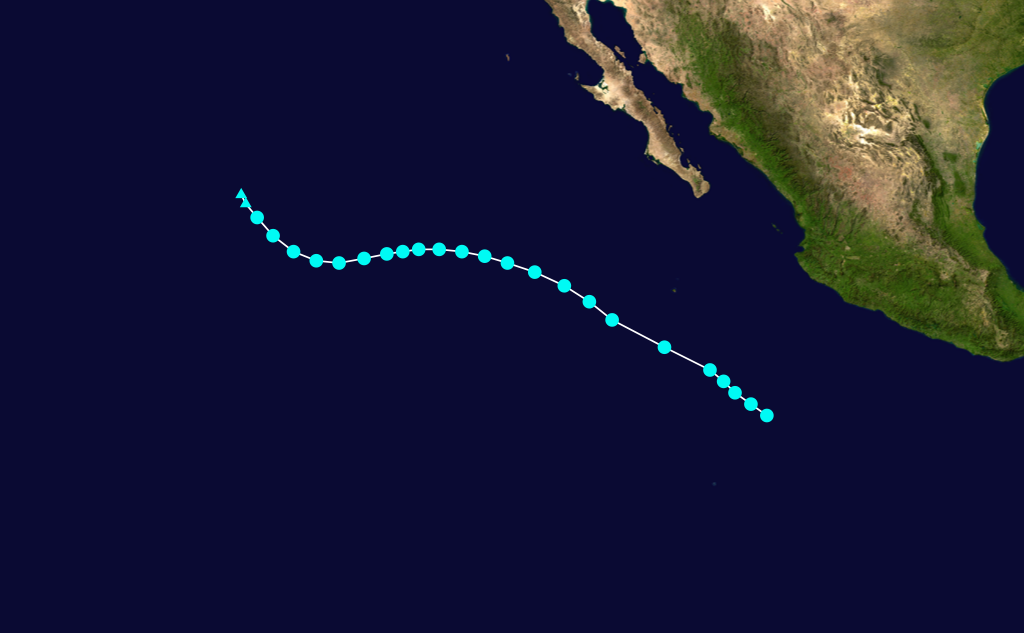
- Duration: August 12 – August 18
- Peak intensity: 70 mph (110 km/h) (1-min);

On August 12, the eighth named storm of the year formed and was named Ilsa. It strengthened to a peak intensity of 70 miles (110 km) per hour on the 14th. The storm held peak intensity for only 6 hours and weakened to have winds of 50 miles (80 km) per hour. The storm weakened rapidly on the night of the 17th and dissipated the next morning never having affected land.

=== Hurricane Jewel ===
- Category 1 hurricane (SSHWS)
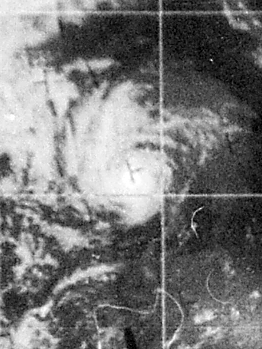
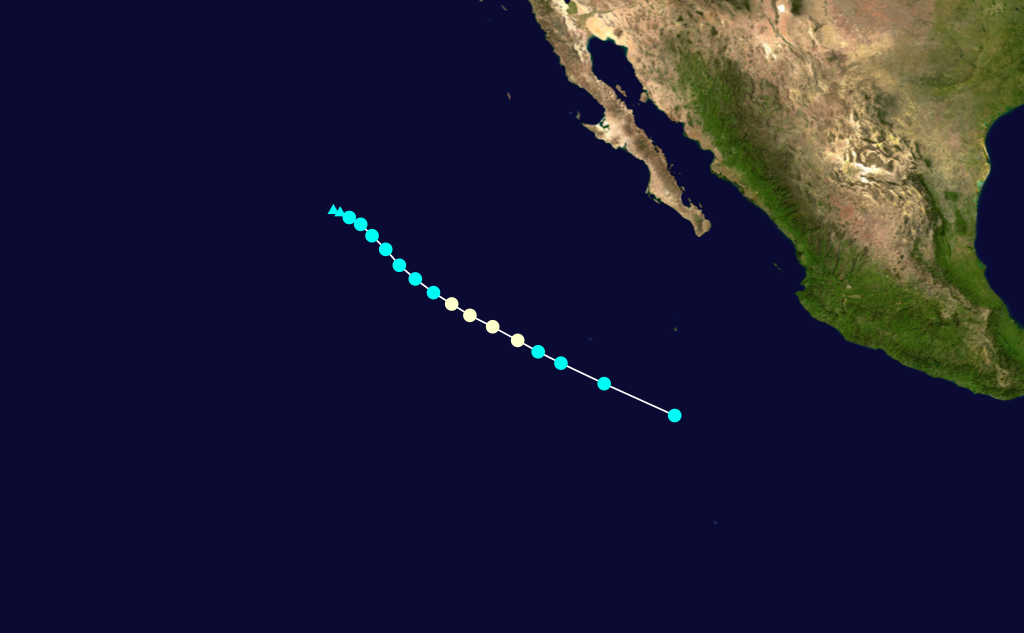
- Duration: August 18 – August 22
- Peak intensity: 85 mph (140 km/h) (1-min); 997 mbar (hPa)

On the day Ilsa dissipated, a new tropical storm was found and named Jewel. It rapidly strengthened that night and reached its peak intensity the next morning. It held peak intensity for 24 hours and weakened the next morning to a moderate tropical storm. It dissipated on the 22nd.

=== Hurricane Katrina ===
- Category 1 hurricane (SSHWS)
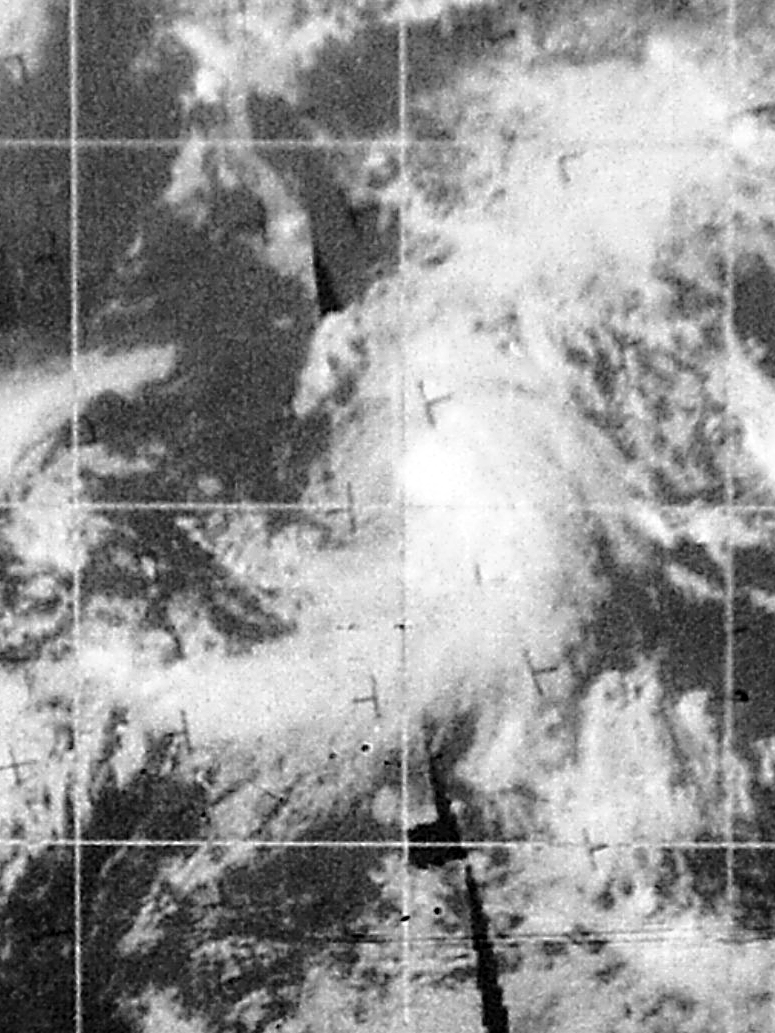
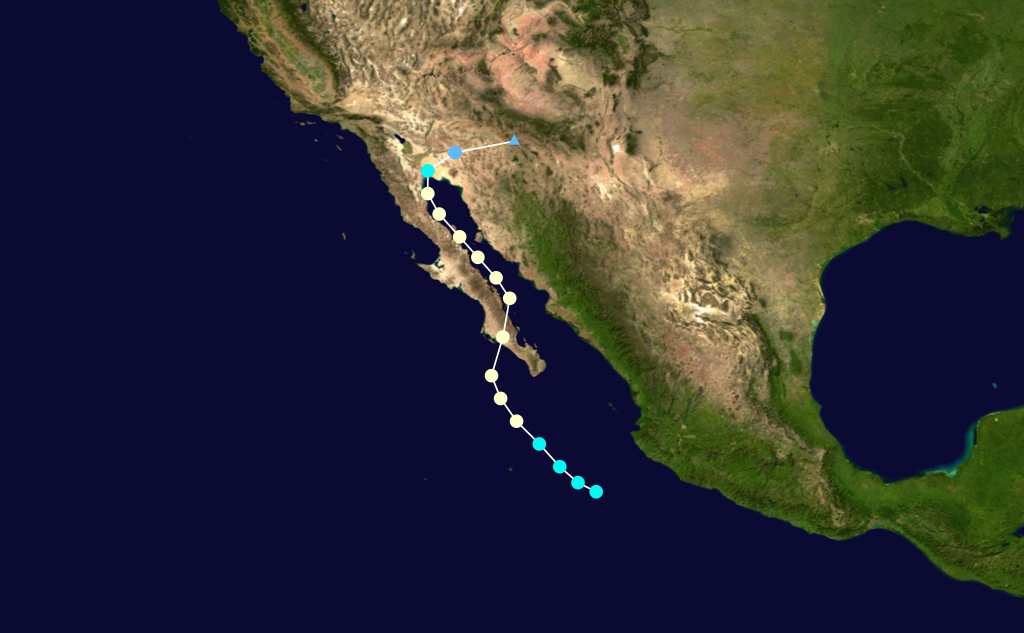
- Duration: August 30 – September 3
- Peak intensity: 85 mph (140 km/h) (1-min);

The first storm to make landfall, Katrina formed on August 30. It became the third hurricane of the season 30 hours after it was named. The night that Katrina became a hurricane, it made landfall on the Baja Peninsula with winds of 85 miles (137 km) per hour. It emerged soon after and paralleled the peninsula until making landfall at the head of the Bay of California. It rapidly weakened to a tropical depression and dissipated over Arizona.

In Mexico, Katrina caused significant damage to parts of San Felipe. A total of 2,500 people were left homeless and 60 ships were sunk. Five people were killed in Mexico.

=== Hurricane Lily ===
- Category 1 hurricane (SSHWS)
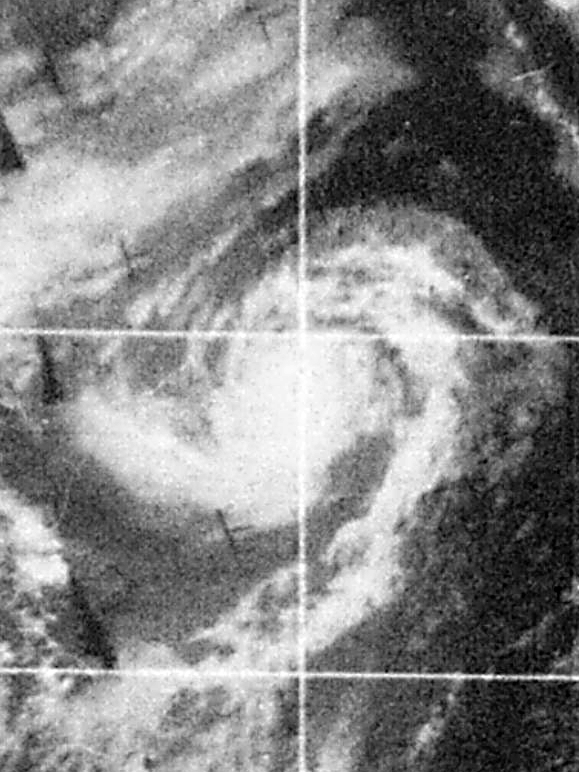
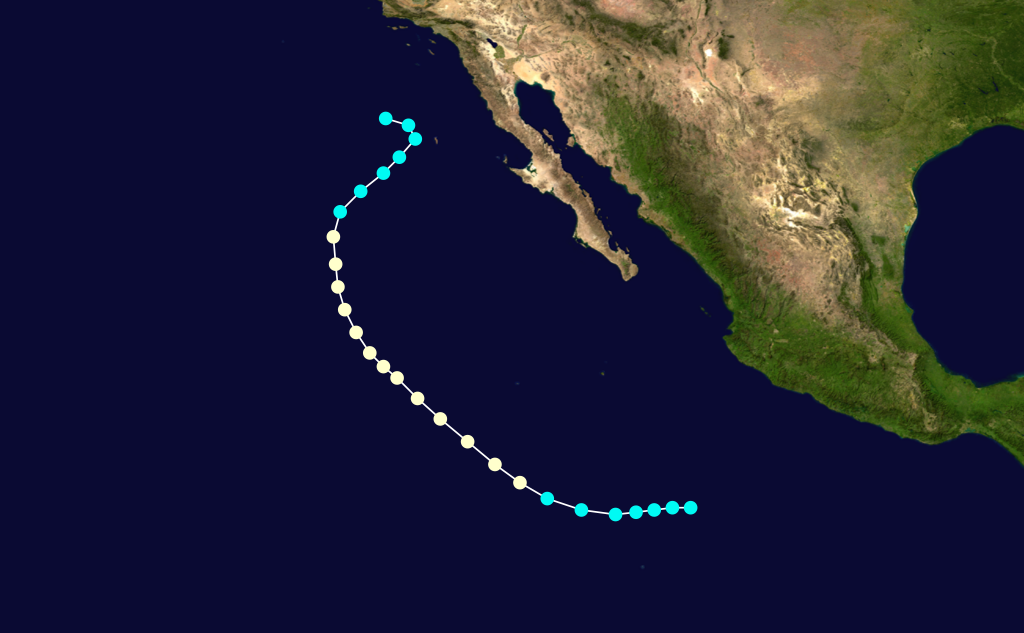
- Duration: September 5 – September 11
- Peak intensity: 85 mph (140 km/h) (1-min); 981 mbar (hPa)

On September 5, a tropical storm formed and was named Lily. Lily became the season's fourth hurricane on the night of September 6. It slightly weakened to have winds of 75 miles (121 km) per hour and stayed this way for 30 hours. It weakened to a tropical storm and dissipated as a tropical cyclone on the 11th, though its surface circulation continued drifting westward near the 30th parallel north and remained identifiable on weather satellite images through the 20th.

=== Hurricane Sarah ===
- Category 2 hurricane (SSHWS)
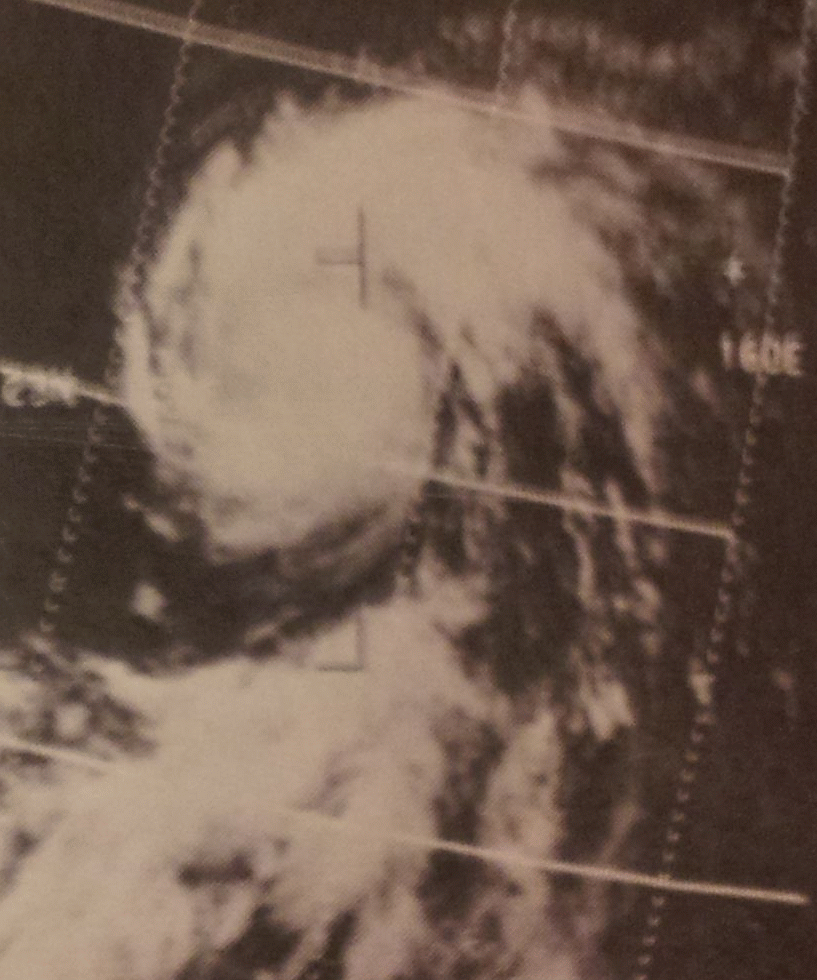
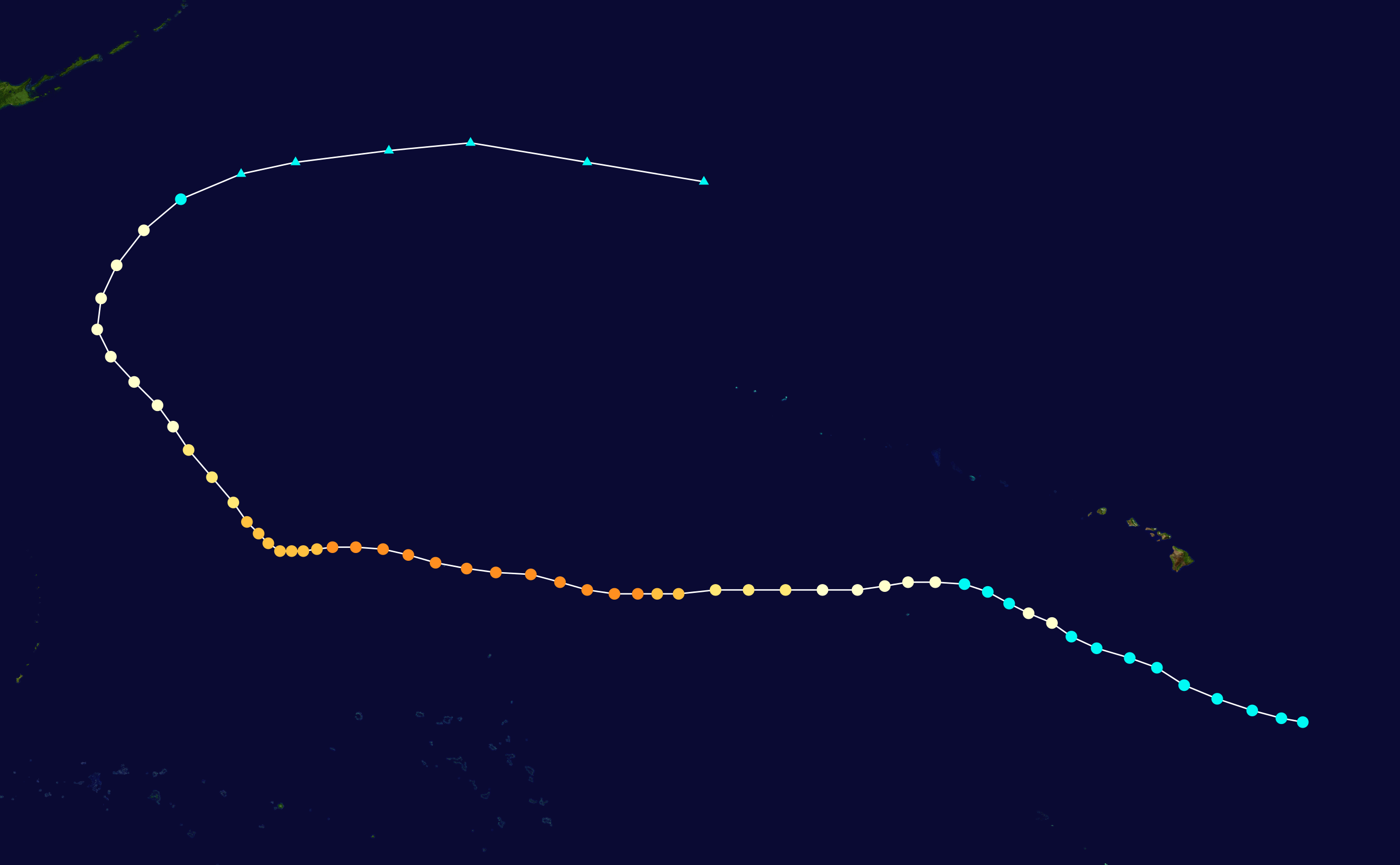
- Duration: September 9 – September 14 (Exited Basin)
- Peak intensity: 110 mph (175 km/h) (1-min); 956 mbar (hPa)

The only storm to form in the Central Pacific during the year, Sarah was found southeast of Hawaii on September 9 with winds of 70 miles (110 km) per hour. It weakened slightly to have winds of 65 miles (105 km) per hour. On September 11, Sarah became a hurricane for twelve hours, before weakening to a tropical storm. Sarah then regained typhoon status crossed into the Western Pacific. After it crossed, it rapidly strengthened to have winds of 150 miles (240 km) per hour. The only measured pressure reading from Sarah was found in the Western Pacific, 932 hectopascals (27.5 inHg). It steadily weakened and became extratropical with winds of 80 miles (130 km) per hour on the 22nd.

=== Tropical Storm Monica ===
- Tropical storm (SSHWS)
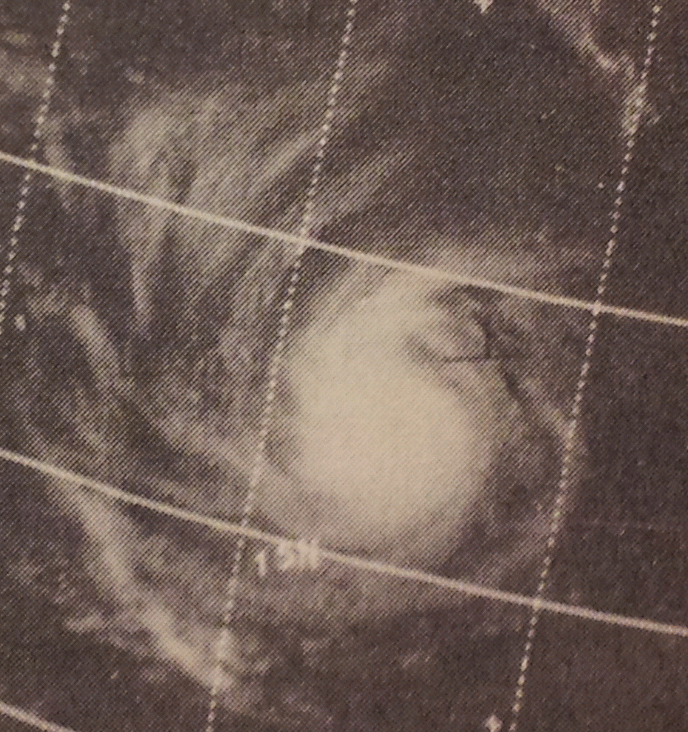
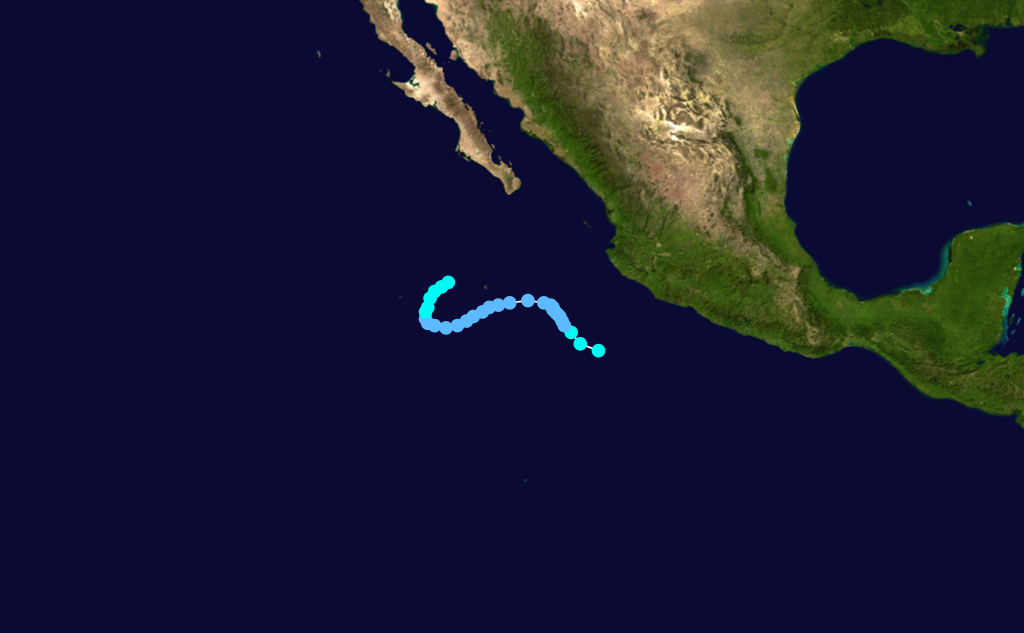
- Duration: September 13 – September 20
- Peak intensity: 60 mph (95 km/h) (1-min);

On September 13, a tropical storm formed south of the Baja Peninsula and was named Monica. It weakened to a tropical depression the next morning and stayed that way until September 19. It became a tropical storm again but never regained peak intensity. It dissipated on September 20.

=== Tropical Storm Nanette ===
- Tropical storm (SSHWS)
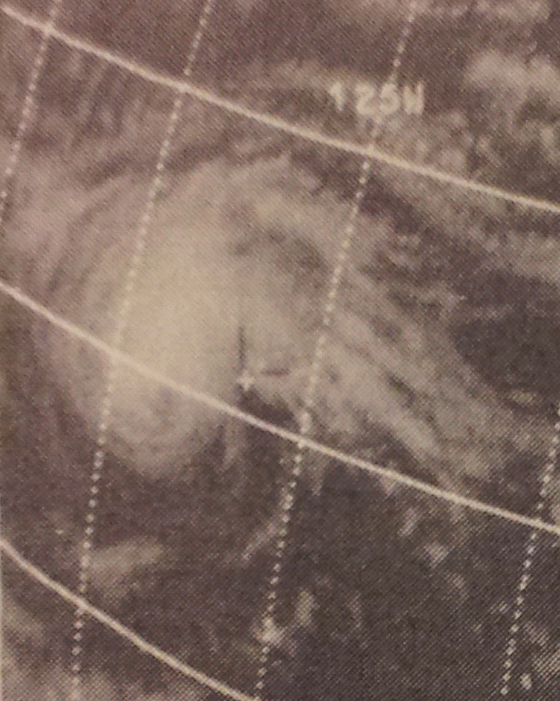
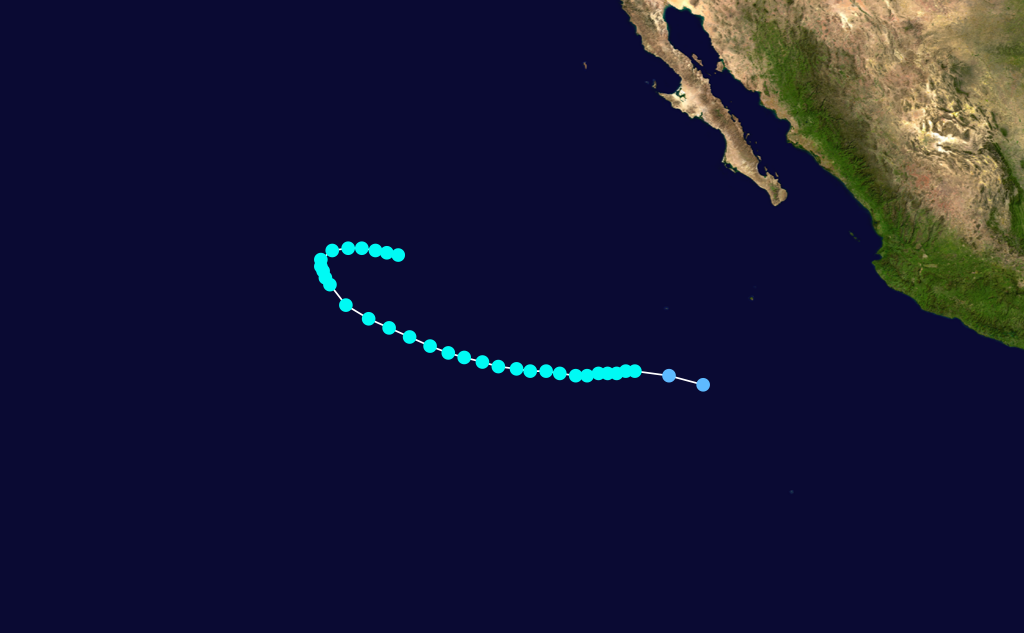
- Duration: September 13 – September 21
- Peak intensity: 50 mph (85 km/h) (1-min);

On September 13, another tropical depression formed directly south of Mexico. Twelve hours later, it became the fourteenth tropical storm of the season, Nanette. It stayed at peak intensity of 50 miles (80 km) per hour until September 21 when it dissipated.

=== Hurricane Olivia ===
- Category 3 hurricane (SSHWS)
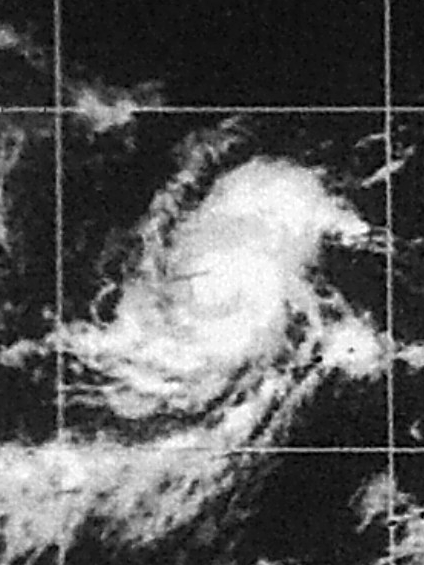
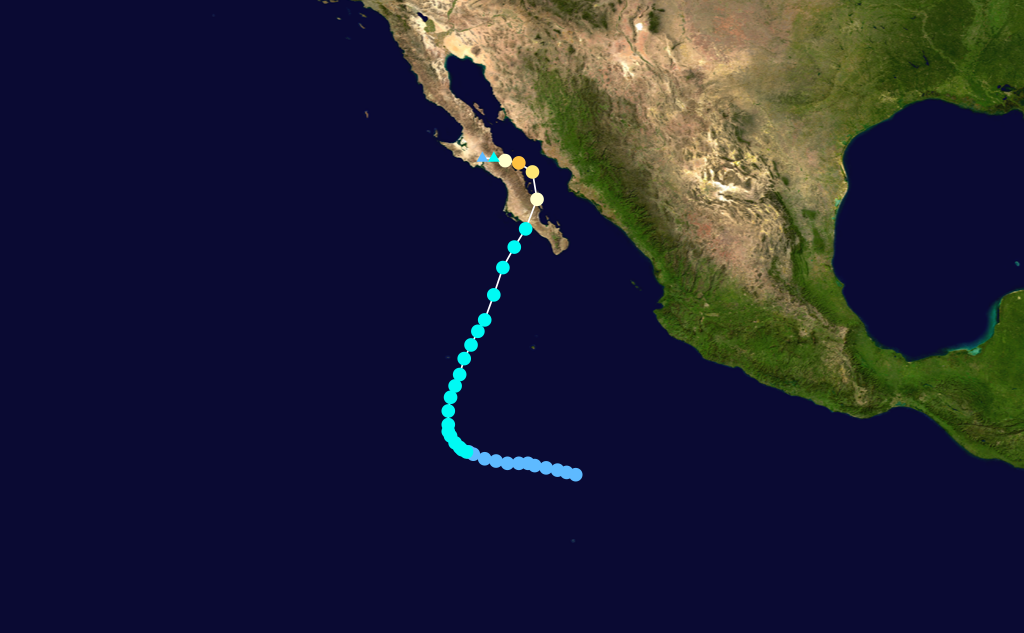
- Duration: October 6 – October 15
- Peak intensity: 125 mph (205 km/h) (1-min); 939 mbar (hPa)

The only major hurricane of the season, Olivia formed on October 6 as a tropical depression. It slowly strengthened and became a tropical storm 3 days later. As a tropical storm, Olivia again took a long time to become a hurricane. It headed north-northeast and hit Baja California with 50 mph winds. On the 13th, Olivia became a hurricane while in the Gulf of California. It rapidly intensified due to its very small size, and reached winds of 125 miles (201 km) per hour for six hours and made landfall on the eastern side of the Baja California Peninsula at that strength. Olivia then weakened even faster than it strengthened and dissipated 18 hours after landfall.

Olivia is only one of two major hurricanes to make landfall on eastern side of the Baja California Peninsula, the other being Hurricane Kiko of 1989. It was also the first major hurricane to be named in the East Pacific. No damage figures exist from Olivia, due to the scarce population of the area it struck. However, a total of 61 people died.

=== Hurricane Priscilla ===
- Category 1 hurricane (SSHWS)
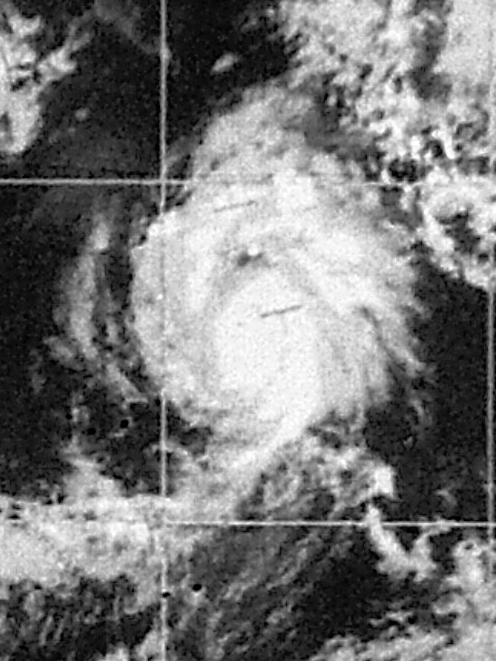
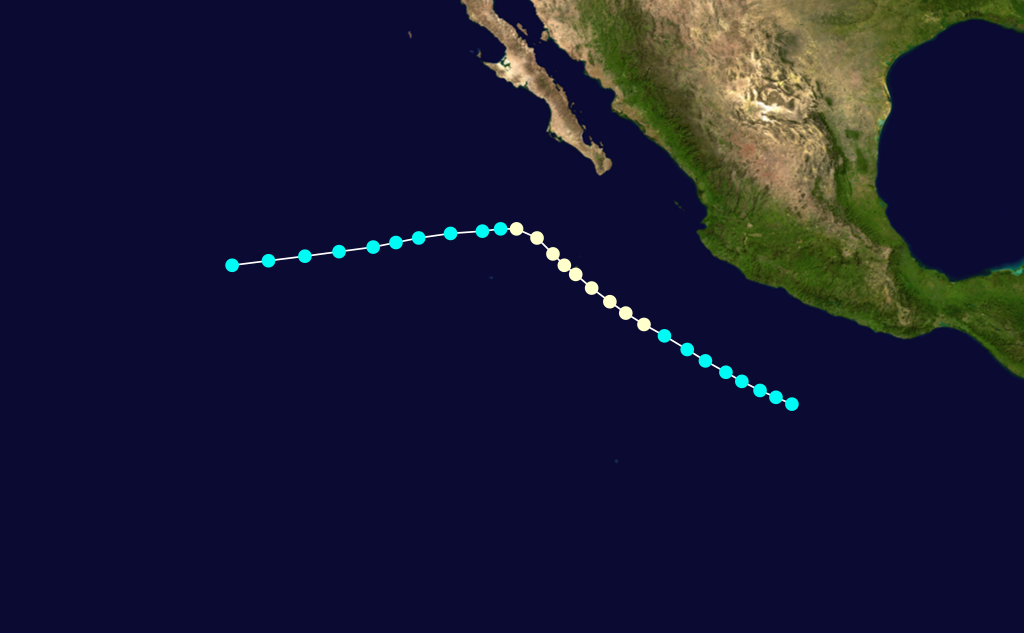
- Duration: October 14 – October 20
- Peak intensity: 85 mph (140 km/h) (1-min);

The final hurricane of the season formed on October 14 south of central Mexico as a tropical storm. It became a hurricane two days later. Priscilla stayed a hurricane for 48 hours until it weakened into a tropical storm on the 18th as it curved westward. It dissipated on October 20.

=== Tropical Storm Ramona ===
- Tropical storm (SSHWS)
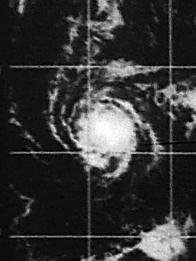
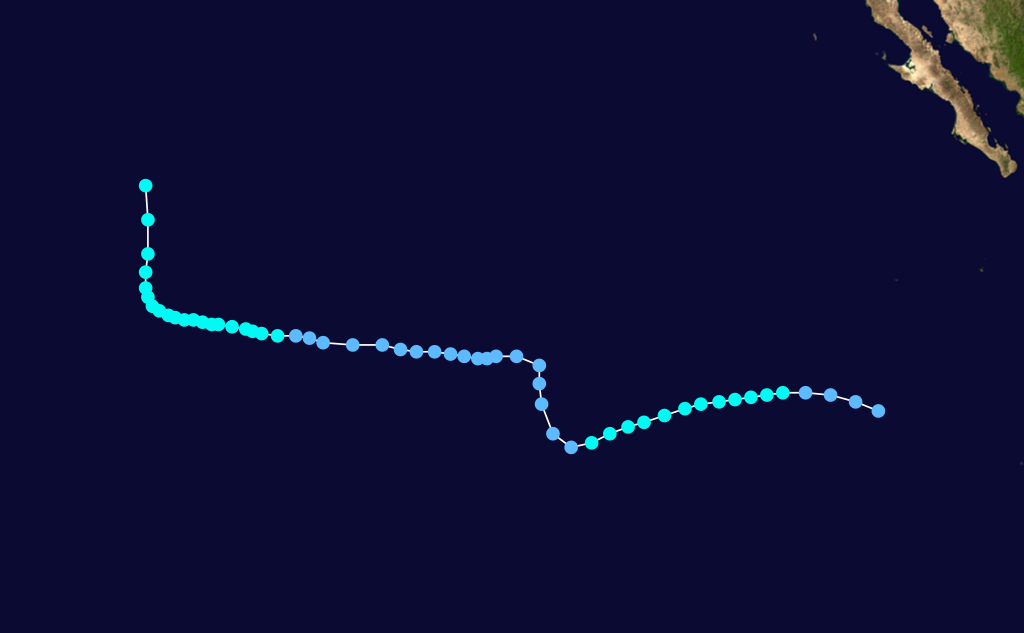
- Duration: October 21 – November 3
- Peak intensity: 50 mph (85 km/h) (1-min);

On October 21, the final tropical storm of the season formed. It became a tropical storm the next morning and was named Ramona. Ramona stayed as a tropical storm until October 25 when it weakened to a tropical depression. The depression again strengthened to a tropical storm on the 29th as the storm started to recurve. The system dissipated while heading due north on November 3.

=== Other systems ===
There were four additional systems in the Central Pacific that were likely tropical depressions but not operationally monitored.

== Storm names ==
The following list of names was used for named storms that formed in the North Pacific Ocean east of 140°W in 1967. This was the fourth of four sets of storm names established at the start of the 1960 season, and was utilized for the first in 1967. As such, every name used that season was used for the first time. This list of names was used again for the 1971 season.

- Agatha
- Bridget
- Carlotta
- Denise *
- Eleanor
- Francene
- Georgette
- Hilary
- Ilsa
- Jewel
- Katrina
- Lily
- Monica
- Nanette
- Olivia
- Priscilla
- Ramona *
- Sharon (unused)
- Terry (unused)
- Veronica (unused)
- Winifred (unused)

One named storm, listed below, formed in the North Pacific between 140°W and the International Date Line in 1967. At the time, storm names within this region were assigned by the Joint Typhoon Warning Center on Guam. Named storms in the table above that crossed into the area during the season are noted (*).

- Sarah

== See also ==
- List of Pacific hurricanes
- 1967 Atlantic hurricane season
- 1967 Pacific typhoon season
- 1967 North Indian Ocean cyclone season
- Australian region cyclone seasons: 1966–67 1967–68
- South Pacific cyclone seasons: 1966–67 1967–68
- South-West Indian Ocean cyclone seasons: 1966–67 1967–68
