= List of lighthouses in Mexico =

This is a list of lighthouses in Mexico. They are located along the Pacific, Gulf of Mexico, and Caribbean coastlines of the country. These are named landfall lights, or those with a range of over fifteen nautical miles.

== Lighthouses ==
Name	Image	Location coordinates	Year built	Tower height (m)	Focal height (m)	Range (nmi)	NGA Number
Arrecife Santiaguillo Lighthouse		Arrecife Santiaguillo	1934	32	32	22	110-15436
Benito Juárez Lighthouse			1872	23			
Cabo Catoche Lighthouse				14	15	15	111-15664
Cabo Corrientes Lighthouse		Cabo Corrientes Municipality	1903	18	93	18	111-15080
Faro Cabo Falso		Cabo San Lucas	1967				
Faro de Cabo San Lucas		Cabo San Lucas		6			111-14548
Cabo Haro Lighthouse		Guaymas		7	107	22	111-14824
Cabo San Lucas Lighthouse		Cabo San Lucas		0	26	15	111-14553
Cabo Tepoca Lighthouse				18	39	15	111-14786
Cazones Lighthouse		Cazones de Herrera	1970s	16	26	15	110-15332
Celestún Lighthouse		Celestún	1883	10			
Celestún Lighthouse		Celestún	1905	12	21		110-15588
Cerro del Gavilan Lighthouse		Coatzacoalcos		14	54	18	110-15464
Cerro Partido Lighthouse		Topolobampo		5	95	22	111-14920
Dzilam de Bravo Lighthouse		Dzilam de Bravo Municipality			18	10	110-15636
Frontera Lighthouse		Frontera	1882	29	30	15	110-15504
Gran Puerto de Cancún Lighthouse		Puerto Juárez	2005	58	58	24	110-15694
Huatulco Lighthouse		Santa María Huatulco		15	60	15	111-15260
Isla Contoy Lighthouse		Quintana Roo	1931	32	33	21	110-15668
Isla de Lobos Lighthouse		Veracruz		22	32	20	110-15276
Isla de Sacrificios Lighthouse		Isla de Sacrificios	1960s	39	42	22	110-15380
Islas de Todos Santos Lighthouse		Isla Todos Santos		30	48	22	111-14364
Isla Maria Madre Lighthouse		Isla María Madre		7	62	17	111-15028
Isla Natividad Lighthouse		Isla Natividad	1938	16	112	20	111-14456
Isla Pérez Lighthouse		Isla Pérez	1899	18	21	20	110-15596
Islas San Benito Lighthouse		Islas San Benito	1934	17			
Islas San Benito Lighthouse		Islas San Benito	2009	7	212	30	111-14412
La Barra Lighthouse		Barra Norte		22	24	15	110-15304
La Roqueta Island Lighthouse		La Roqueta		15	115	25	111-15208
Lazaro Cardenas Lighthouse		Lázaro Cárdenas		35	40	19	111-15160
Majahual Lighthouse		Costa Maya	2006	22	22	20	110-15782
Malecón Lighthouse		Puerto Vallarta	1932	10			
Matamoros Lighthouse		Puerto Vallarta	1932	12			
Mazatlán Lighthouse		Isla del Crestón	1879	11	157	33	111-14964
Mezquital Lighthouse		Matamoros	2013	26	25	18	110-15203.1
Morro de Salinas Lighthouse		Port of Salina Cruz	1896	14	83	20	111-15272
Playa del Carmen Lighthouse		Playa del Carmen					
Progreso Lighthouse		Progreso	1893	33	35	20	110-15620
Puerto Angel Lighthouse		Puerto Ángel	1900	14	56	20	111-15256
Puerto Arista Lighthouse		Puerto Arista					111-15308
Puerto Escondido Lighthouse			1936	15	40	16	15252
Puerto Madero Lighthouse				22	24	15	15324
Puerto Morelos Lighthouse		Puerto Morelos	1988	14	16	15	110-15704
Puerto Morelos Lighthouse		Puerto Morelos	1946	10			
Puerto Penasco Lighthouse				9	97	17	14778
Punta Arena de la Ventana Lighthouse			2009	25	15	18	14572
Punta Brujas Lighthouse				4	40	20	15224
Punta Campos Lighthouse				11	109	20	15140
Punta Cancun Lighthouse		Quintana Roo					110-15696
Celarain Lighthouse		Punta Sur	1934	25	32	15	15744
Punta Delgada Lighthouse				22	46	18	15352
Punta Farrallon Lighthouse				22	62	15	15088
Punta Garrobo Lighthouse			1939	13	115	18	15180
Punta Graham Lighthouse				11	200	20	15092
Punta Jerez Lighthouse			1990	20	22	20	15212
Punta Maldonado Lighthouse				15	40	15	15240
Punta Morro Lighthouse			1896	16	54	18	15552
Punta Palmas Lighthouse			1950	39	42	20	15592
Punta Piedra Lighthouse			2009	25	28	18	15207
Punta Prieta Lighthouse				20	30	15	14588
Punta Roca Partida Lighthouse							
Punta San Telmo Lighthouse				12	70	18	15152
Rio Lagartos Lighthouse		Yucatán		20	22	16	15644
San Bartolo Hill Lighthouse				12	78	18	15564
San Blas Lighthouse				14	44	18	15012
San Felipe Lighthouse				22	44	18	14756
San Jose del Cabo Lighthouse				10	36	15	14560
San Miguel de Cozumel Lighthouse			2000	36	37	15	15732
Tampico Lighthouse			1883	40	43	24	15220
Tecolutla lighthouse		Tecolutla		23	25	15	15336
Tijuana Lighthouse		Playas de Tijuana		22	40	20	14338
Venustiano Carranza Lighthouse		Veracruz					
Xicalango Lighthouse		Campeche		28	32	18	110-15516

== See also ==
- Lists of lighthouses and lightvessels
