= Observatorio 1873 =

Tourism park in Mazatlán, Mexico

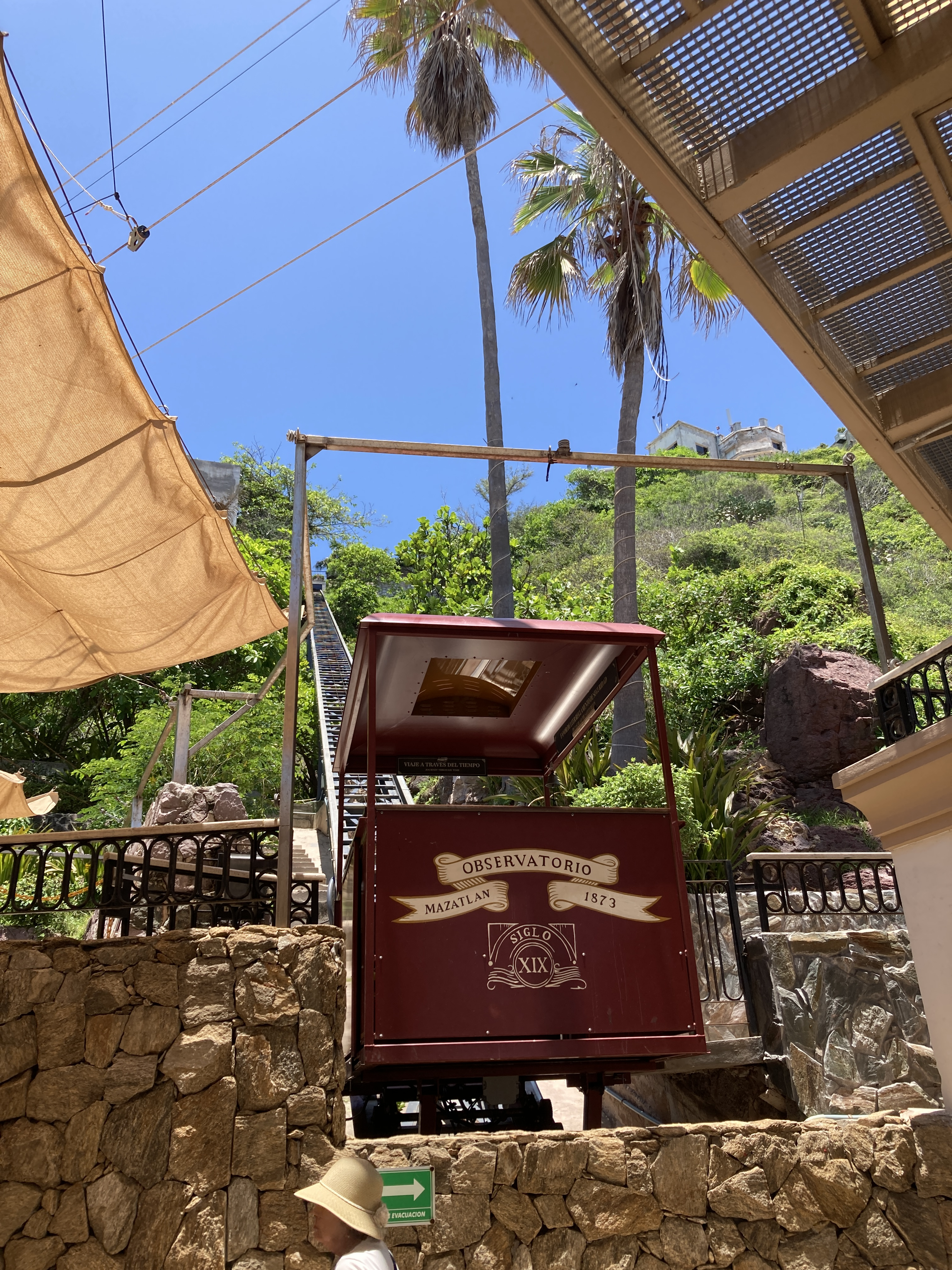
- Observatorio 1873's funicular in 2025
- Interactive map of Observatorio 1873
- Type: Animal sanctuary
- Location: Paseo Del centenario 218, Cerro del Vigía, Mazatlán, Sinaloa, Mexico
- Created: 1873
- Opening: March 23, 2021; 5 years ago
- Founder: Amado Guzmán
- Owner: Amado Guzmán
- Open: Year-round
- Status: Existing
- Website: observatorio1873.com

Observatorio 1873 (English: Observatory 1873) is a tourism park in Mazatlán, Sinaloa, Mexico. The site originally was constructed in the mid-19th century as a military lookout to defend the port against pirates and enemies. In 1873, it was converted into an observatory focused on meteorology and seismology, positioning it as one of the foremost institutions of its type in the Porfiriato era. After falling into disuse, the site was acquired by the businessman Amado Guzmán, who began renovations around 2017 and opened it as a tourist park on 21 March, 2021.

Spanning multiple levels, the tourist park is at the top of Cerro del Vigía, a hill that is 75 m (246 ft) above sea level. It can be reached via a staircase or a funicular and offers panoramic views of the Pacific Ocean and Crestón Island, which houses the Faro Mazatlán. Farolesa, a zip line, opened in 2024 and connects the Crestón Island to Observatorio 1873. There are two animal sanctuaries: an aviary for rescued birds and an iguana sanctuary.

Observatorio 1873 houses the former observatory building, which was converted into a manor house museum with furniture, photos, and other items related to Mazatlán history. Next to the manor house is an agave garden. At the summit of the building is the bar and restaurant Skybar 360°. At the park's base is the National Whale Museum (Spanish: El Museo Nacional de la Ballena, MUMBA), which has 12 interactive galleries and houses Mexico and Latin America's most extensive assortment of cetaceans skeletons.

== Location ==
Observatorio 1873 is located in Mazatlán, Sinaloa, Mexico, at the top of Cerro del Vigía, a hill that is 75 m (246 ft) above sea level. From the hill, visitors can see Crestón Island, which houses the Faro Mazatlán, and the Pacific Ocean. The observatory is roughly 10 minutes by vehicle from Old Mazatlán and can be entered via the promenade Paseo del Centenario. Paseo del Centenario was built in 1910 to honor the centennial of the beginning of the Mexican War of Independence. The promenade is referenced in the song "Corrido de Mazatlán" by José Alfredo Jiménez and is regarded as one of Mazatlán's unofficial anthems. Spanning multiple levels and occupying 500 m^{2} (5,400 sq ft), Observatorio 1873 has gardens, museums, a bar with panoramic views, a funicular, and animal sanctuaries.

== History ==
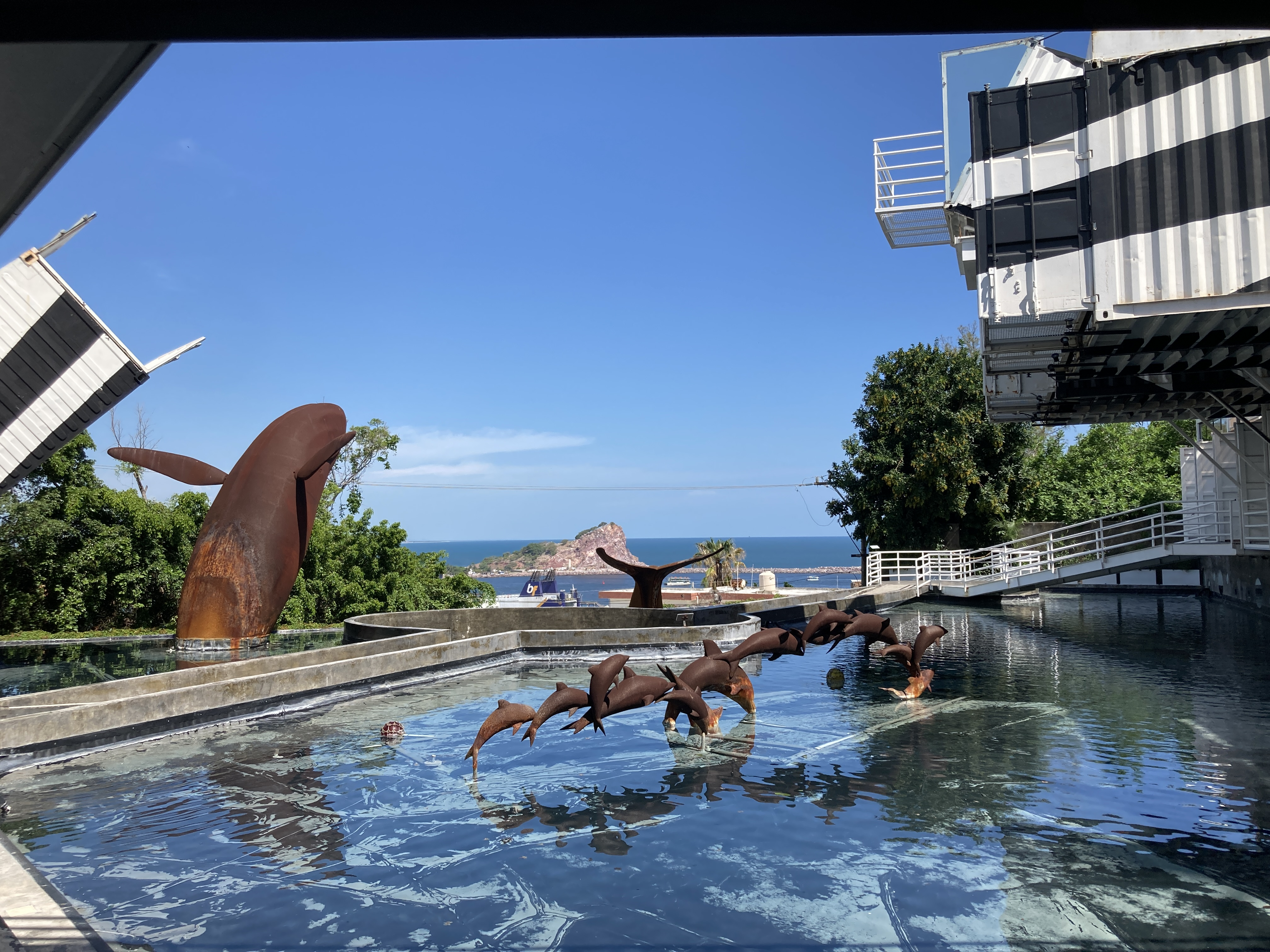
The National Whale Museum (Spanish: El Museo Nacional de la Ballena, MUMBA) in 2025

Constructed in the middle of the 19th century, the site that is home to present-day Observatorio 1873 was erected for use as a military lookout point for defending Mazatlán against hostile ships and piracy. The lookout sounded a bell to signal when a ship arrived or departed from Mazatlán. This is why the hill, now the location of Observatorio 1873, is named Cerro del Vigía, which literally means Lookout Hill. It was transformed in 1873 into Observatorio Mazatlán, an observatory focused on data collection in meteorology and seismology. This positioned it during the Porfiriato period as among the most prominent facilities of its type. People from the observatory released latex balloons containing devices mounted to capture the temperature, rainfall, and wind. Between 1900 and 1910, one of Mexico's earliest seismographs was set up in the observatory. Built in a French-inspired Neoclassical architectural style, the observatory fell into disuse and was neglected.

Around 2017, Observatorio 1873 underwent several years of renovations since the owner aimed to establish it as a major draw for tourists. The renovation was guided by the themes of history, tradition, and nature. The property began operations as a tourist park for the first time in February 2020 but needed to pause operations owing to the COVID-19 pandemic in Mexico. During the temporary closure, Observatorio 1873 introduced additional attractions. The site was reopened on 23 March 2021. The reopening ceremony was attended by Quirino Ordaz Coppel, the Governor of Sinaloa; Miguel Torruco Marqués, the Secretary of Tourism; and José Manuel Villalobos Jiménez, the interim mayor of Mazatlán. In its first year of operation after reopening, Observatorio 1873 had over 20,000 visitors, including people from Canada, France, Japan, Russia, and the United States.

The company Operadora Turística Observatorio 1873 S.A. de C.V. runs the tourist complex. It was built and is owned by Amado Guzmán, a director of the Mexican conglomerate Grupo Petroil, whose holdings include Observatorio 1873. Guzmán's family business, which was founded in the 1950s, sold hydrocarbons. Guzmán established Grupo Redpetroil, a company that serves the fish industry through operating filling stations. He is the president of Consejo Centro Histórico Mazatlán and is a member of the inner circle of Quirino Ordaz Coppel.

Around 2017, Guzmán suggested building Farolesa, a zip line. He turned in an environmental impact statement plan for building the Farolesa, a zip line, on 10 November 2020, to the government. Workers began constructing the zip line between the hills Cerro del Vigía (home to Observatorio 1873) and Cerro del Crestón (home to the lighthouse Faro Mazatlán) in December 2023. Environmentalists opposed the construction, stating that the development would harm the hill's ecosystems which have endemic species of flora and fauna. They argued that there would be deforestation, that there would be damage to the hill that could cause it to break apart, and that the granting of a concession for using the lighthouse premises was tied to corruption. They opposed the privatization of public land.

The National Port System Administration (Spanish: Administración del Sistema Portuario Nacional), which reports to the Secretariat of the Navy, had awarded a 20-year concession for Observatorio 1873 to use 66 square metres (710 sq ft) of the land for a monthly charge set at Mex$7,000 (US$382) as well as 5% of the entrance fee. The government had granted a concession of 60 m^{2} (650 sq ft) for building a glass bridge and a staircase. At the beginning of construction, the Mirador de Cristal, a lookout on the Crestón hill, was shut down owing to concerns about how the hammer drilling could cause a landslide or rockfall on the hill's western side. The Eight District Court of Mazatlán denied five injunction requests opposing the construction. Shortly after the construction started, protesters assembled at Paseo Olas to demonstrate at Observatorio 1873, warning that the initiative would amount to ecocide. Protests took place between April and October 2024. In one test of the zip line, the cable broke. After undergoing months of testing, the zip line was inaugurated on 16 December 2024, as the Farolesa. Guzmán had spent over MXN$40 million (US$2,185,212) on the initiative.

On 23 July 2024, the National Whale Museum (Spanish: El Museo Nacional de la Ballena, MUMBA) opened at Observatorio 1873, having been developed under the direction of Guzmán. The museum resulted from a partnership with Museo de la Ballena y Ciencias Del Mar, a whale and marine science museum in La Paz, the capital of Baja California Sur. Josefina Rodríguez Zamora, Mexico's Secretariat of Tourism, made her inaugural official trip to the state of Sinaloa in 2024. She visited the tourist attractions Observatorio 1873 and the National Whale Museum. After Marco Verde, who was born in Mazatlán, won a silver medal at the 2024 Summer Olympics, he was awarded a yearly pass to Observatorio 1873.

== Features ==
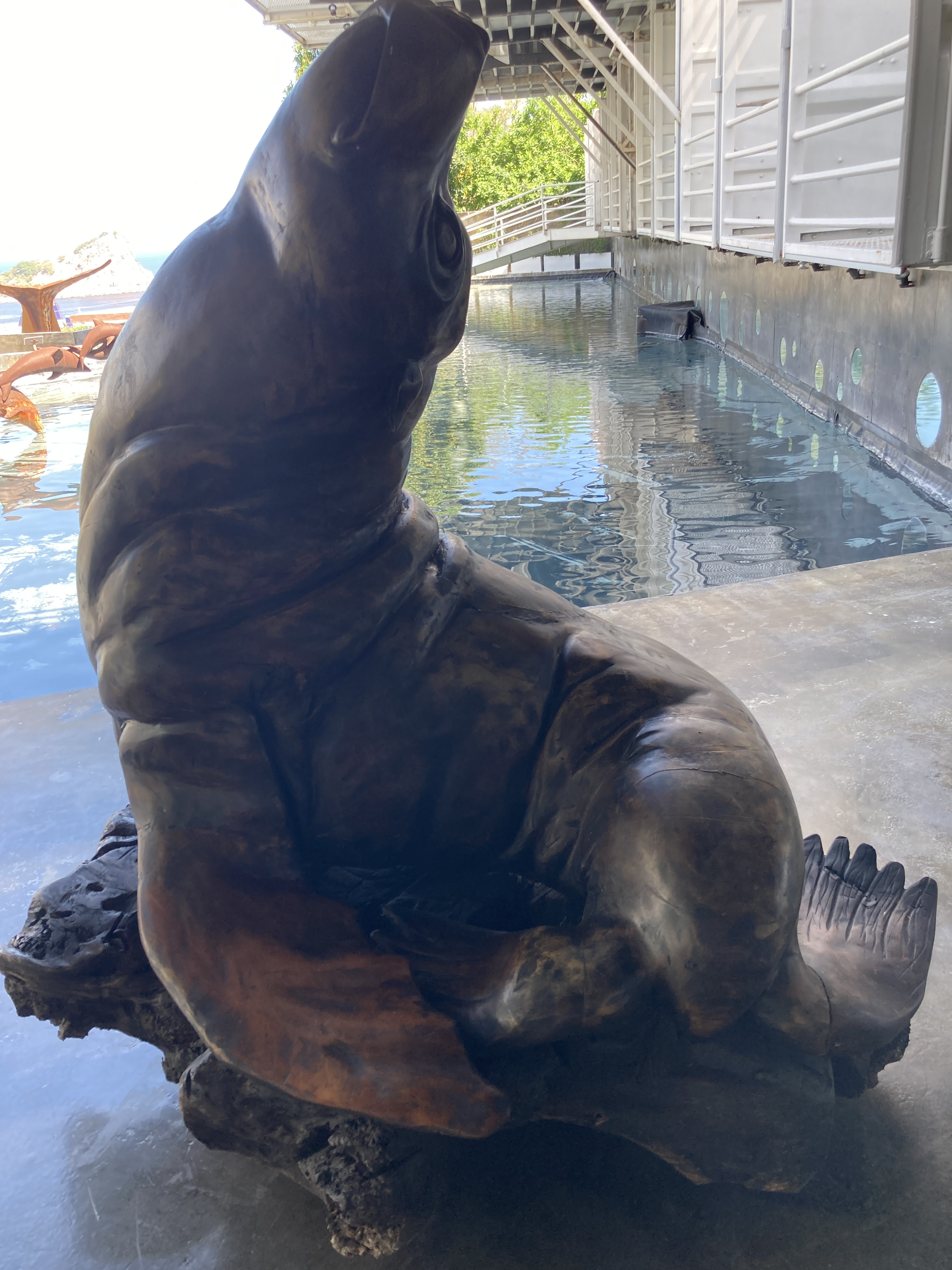
A sea lion sculpture at the National Whale Museum in 2025

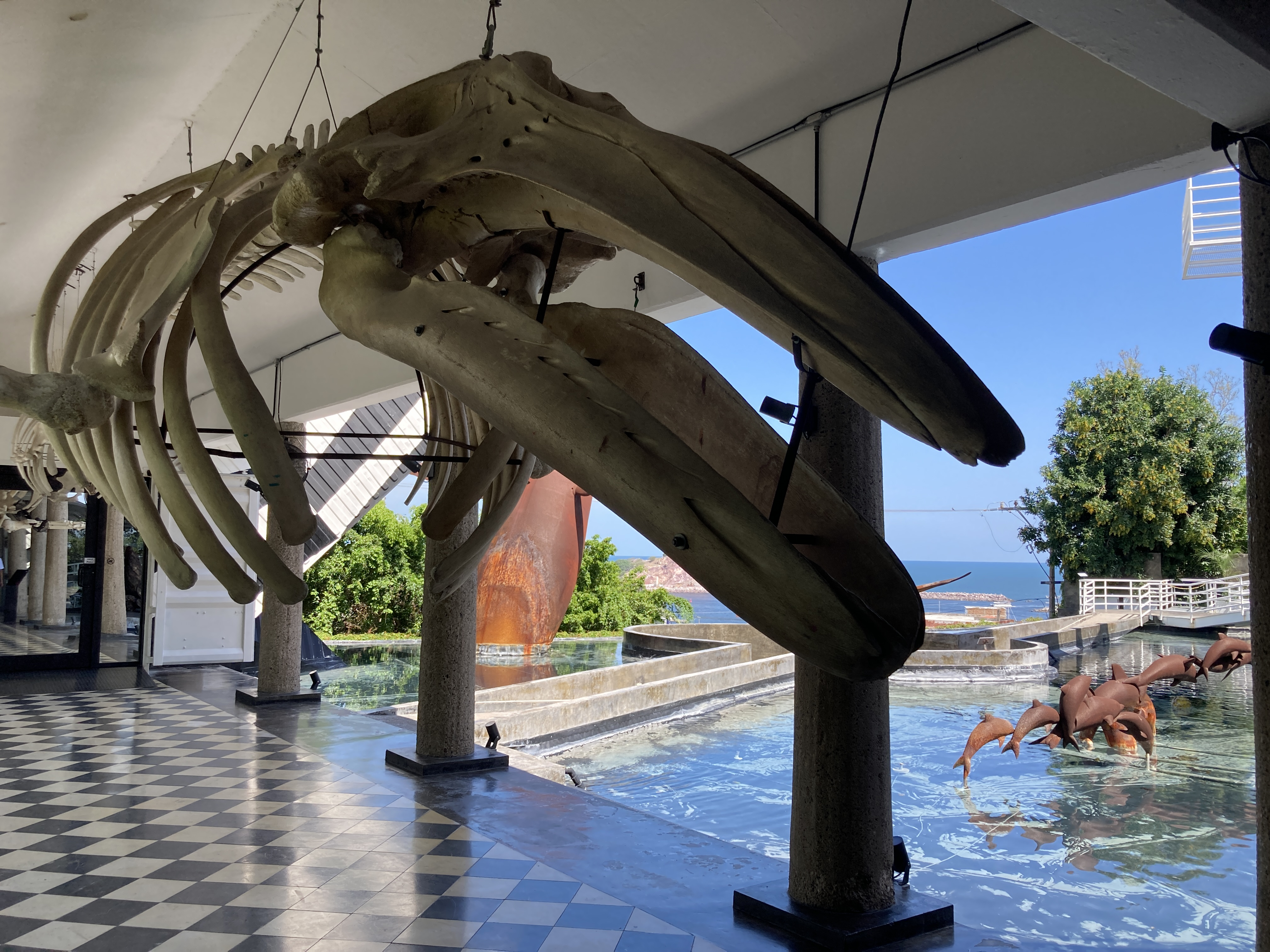
A whale skeleton at the museum in 2025

Near its entrance, Observatorio 1873 features a Porfirian-style hall. The venue broadcasts a documentary about the site's history. Located atop the hill Cerro del Vigía, the site's museum and gardens can be reached through either walking up 100 steps or riding a funicular with panoramic views that ascends 80 m (260 ft). Named Caminito al cielo ("Little Path to Heaven"), the staircase features a compass rose and a statue of the Virgin of the Watch (Spanish: Virgen del Vigía). The staircase steps are inscribed with lyrics from the José Alfredo Jiménez song "Corrido de Mazatlán", which mention Paseo del Centenario, the street where Observatorio 1873 is located. Offering a ride of more than two minutes, the funicular provides views of the Pacific Ocean, the hill Cerro del Crestón, and White Rocks (Spanish: Piedras Blancas). The funicular received the 2021 top global award in the "inclined elevators" division from the magazine Elevator World. At the hilltop is a garden containing trees native to Mazatlán and views of Faro Mazatlán, a koi pond, and Lovers' Corner (Spanish: Rincón de los Enamorados), a place for taking photos.

The summit features the 19th-Century Museum (Spanish: Museo Siglo XIX), the former observatory building converted into a manor house styled like a tiny castle. After its 21st-century refurbishment the museum's structure continued to keep the façade from when it was built. It managed to stay largely well preserved over time even though the port's salty air tended to erode structures quickly. To make the building last longer, its builders had used seashells and concrete in its construction. Offering a replica of a 19th-century residence, the museum has furniture from the time period and archival images of the hill. It features Mexican Revolution-era flags. The museum displays a cash register previously owned by the Echeguren family, books, trunks, a searchlight, pharmaceutical supplies, machines, and musical instruments.

An agave garden is adjacent to the manor house and has more than 30 species of agaves and cacti endemic to the country. Plant species include Agave americana, Agave attenuata, Agave fourcroydes, and Echinocactus platyacanthus. Nearby is a reproduction of a classic distillery at which tourists can sample three varieties of mezcal. Observatorio 1873 has two animal sanctuaries. Most of the animals in the sanctuaries were saved from dangerous situations, including wildlife smuggling. The first animal sanctuary is The Nest (Spanish: El Nido), an aviary that has more than 70 bird species who have been rescued. The aviary houses birds such as flamingos, toucans, and parrots like scarlet macaws and Australian parakeets. Visitors are joined by a staff member who describes the birds' backstories and noteworthy facts. A raised wooden path encircles a building, allowing visitors to give the birds food. The aviary had once housed the observatory's seismograph in the early 20th century. The Secretariat of Environment and Natural Resources designated it as an Environmental Management Unit (Spanish: Unidad de Manejo Ambiental) in which rehabilitated birds would be returned to their natural environment. Iguana Land (Spanish: Tierra Iguana), the second sanctuary, is located at the center of Observatorio 1873. Housing iguanas that can reach 2 m (6.6 ft) long, it is furnished with foliage, bridges, and ponds.

Erected at the top of the 19th-Century Museum is the bar and restaurant Skybar 360°. It offers a vantage point of the port and serves spirits, cocktails, and craft beer. The venue stays open later in the day beyond the closing time of Observatorio 1873's other features. Observatorio 1873 designated an area called Roots (Spanish: Raíces) to be an "ancestral gathering center". As the park's most private section, it provides visitors a place for introspecting and resting. Overlooking the Pacific Ocean, it is encircled by foliage. Various events are held there including cacao and chocolate rituals, Mayan sign readings, Tibetan standing bell experiences, and wedding vow renewal ceremonies.

Farolesa, a zip line linking Cerro del Vigía, where Observatorio 1873 is located, and Cerro del Crestón, the site of the lighthouse Faro Mazatlán, opened in 2024. The name Farolesa pays tribute to the lighthouse Faro Mazatlán. Ecoprojects constructed the zip line, which was certified as safe by Aire Libre Internacional and the Association for Challenge Course Technology. Rides begin at the lighthouse's hill and end at Observatorio 1873's entry point. To access the zip line's takeoff point at the lighthouse, visitors have to hike 765 m (2,510 ft) of trail, which takes 40 minutes, and then ascend 336 steps. Five vantage points can be found on the trail, each at a different elevation, with the majority offering sights of Goats' Hill (Spanish: Cerro de los Chivos) and Stone Island (Spanish: Isla de la Piedra). The zip line is 1,265 m (4,150 ft) long, has an elevation of 160 m (520 ft), and is supported by three cables. With a maximum speed of 100 km (62 mi), the zip line has an average speed of 75 km (47 mi) and can hold at most 2,300 kg (5,000 lb). The zip line takes about 1.5 minutes to complete, during which riders can see the boardwalk, the promenade Paseo Olas Altas, and massive hotel structures as well as birds like brown pelicans, black skimmers, peregrine falcons, and turkey vultures. It is open to users aged 10 and above. On average, between 60 and 70 people used the zip line every day in 2026. The peak daily total for using the zip line was 180 people. In 2026, Farolesa was staffed by 21 employees.

The National Whale Museum (Spanish: El Museo Nacional de la Ballena, MUMBA) is at the hill's base and has 12 interactive galleries. It was built in a nod to whales, particularly humpback whales, being a representation of Mazatlán's biodiversity. The developers repurposed shipping containers to build the structure to emphasize sustainability. The museum has sculptural pieces of whales and dolphins as well as reflecting pools. Mexico and Latin America's most extensive assortment of cetaceans skeletons is held there. Of the more than 29 skeletons, most are from dolphins and whales. The museum displays skeletons of a gray whale, a humpback whale calf, a minke whale, bottlenose dolphins, Risso's dolphins, rough-toothed dolphins, spinner dolphins, and orcas. Visitors to the museum can take guided tours that cover how whales evolved genetically, their group dynamics, the present-day threats impacting their survival, and their impact on the ecosystem. Museum exhibits include a multimedia theater, an augmented reality exhibit, and experiences that engage the senses. Titled Thalassa's Journey (Spanish: Viaje de Thalassa), one room presents actual video of humpback whales as they migrate. Another room, titled The Hunt for Leviathan (Spanish: La Caza del Leviatán), shows animated scenes based on the eponymous biblical sea creature.
