= Cabo Catoche =

Point on the Yucatán Peninsula

Coordinates: 21.6058°N 87.1033°W

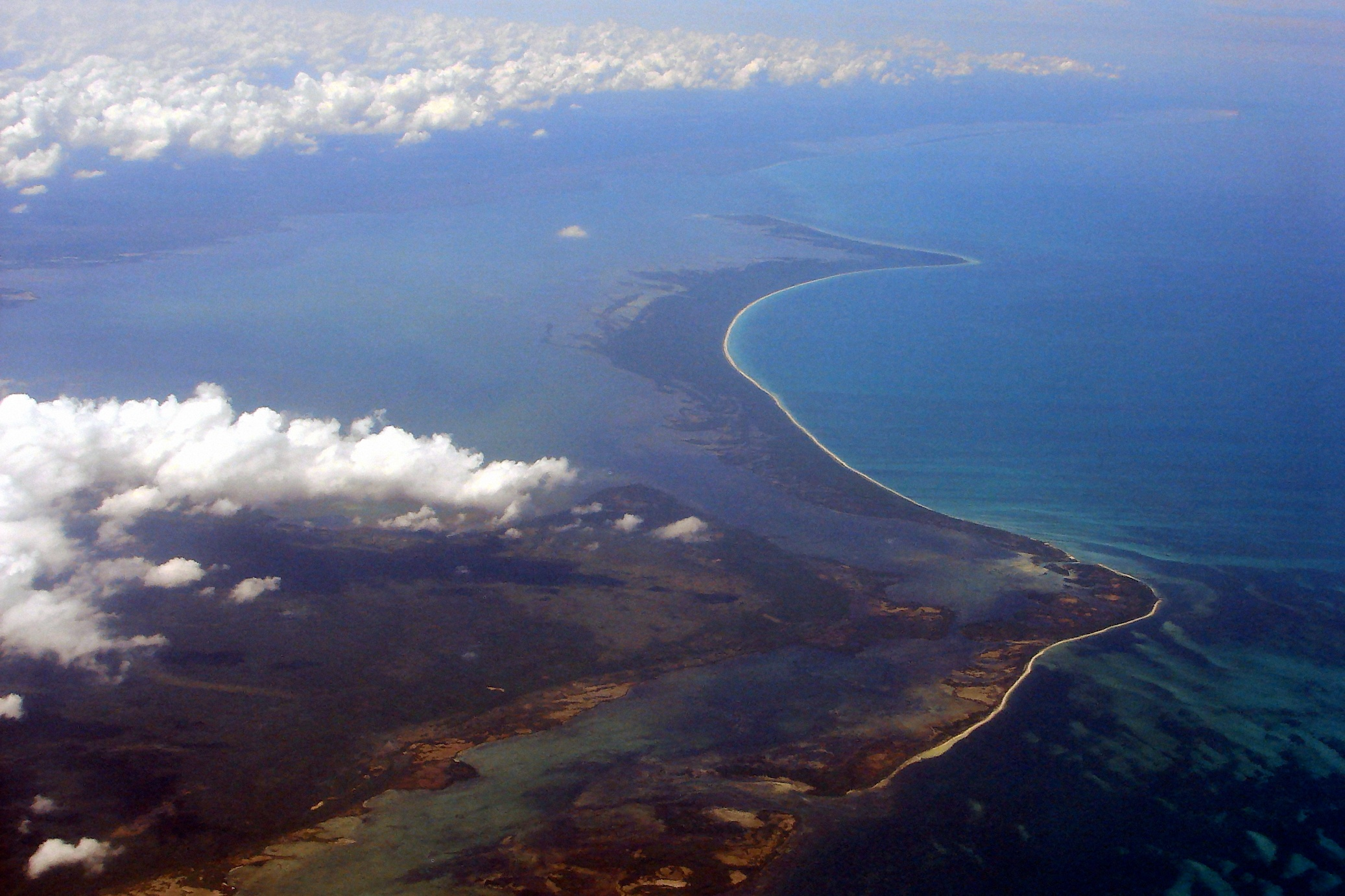
Aerial view of Cabo Catoche, with Holbox in the background (north is to the right)

Cabo Catoche or Cape Catoche, in the Mexican state of Quintana Roo, is the northernmost point on the Yucatán Peninsula. It lies in the municipality of Isla Mujeres, about 53 km (33 mi) north of the city of Cancún. According to the International Hydrographic Organization, it marks the division point between the Caribbean Sea to the east and Gulf of Mexico to the west.

The name is believed to be a corruption of the Mayan word cotoch, meaning "our houses, our homeland". "Cotoch" is the name used by the Spanish Franciscan bishop Diego de Landa to refer to the region in 1566.

Catoche was the location of the first intentional landing by Europeans in the territory of modern-day Mexico, during the Córdoba expedition, on 4 March 1517. The Spanish were invited into the native town with "Cones catoche, cones catoche, which means: 'Come to our houses'." On the way, the Spaniards were ambushed, suffering thirteen wounded to the native's fifteen killed. The Spaniards captured two natives, baptized as Julian and Melchior, who became interpreters on future Spanish expeditions, before Melchior turned against the Spaniards at the Battle of Centla.

This is also the site of the first known accidental landing, a shipwreck in 1511, from which Gerónimo de Aguilar and Gonzalo Guerrero survived.

The lighthouse at Cabo Catoche is the location of the internationally recognized official boundary between the Gulf of Mexico and the Caribbean Sea.

Directly west of Cabo Catouche is Holbox Island and Yalahau lagoon, where the waters of the Gulf of Mexico and the Caribbean Sea converge, creating a rich environment for an abundance of marine and bird life. These waters are home to the largest gathering of whale sharks in the world for about five months out of the year. Because of the mixing of these waters and the white coraline sands, clear turquoise and emerald waters are found. This island is a protected area and the sands are an important hatchery for sea turtles and a host of bird species.

The Yalahau Lagoon is a fresh water lagoon and so deep that the water appears to be black. In satellite photographic images the lagoon appears to be a black hole.

== See also ==
- List of lighthouses in Mexico
