= Hurricane Beulah =

Category 5 Atlantic hurricane in 1967

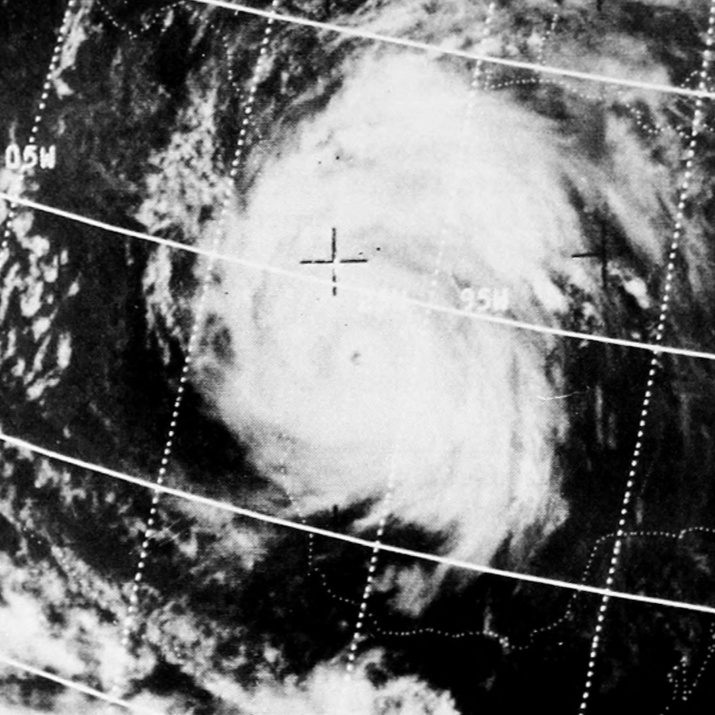
- Beulah in the Gulf of Mexico as a Category 5 hurricane on September 19

Meteorological history
- Formed: September 5, 1967
- Dissipated: September 22, 1967

Category 5 major hurricane
- 1-minute sustained (SSHWS/NWS)
- Highest winds: 160 mph (260 km/h)
- Lowest pressure: 921 mbar (hPa); 27.20 inHg

Overall effects
- Fatalities: 59 direct
- Damage: $235 million (1967 USD)
- Areas affected: Greater Antilles, Yucatán Peninsula, Northeastern Mexico, South Texas
- IBTrACS
- Part of the 1967 Atlantic hurricane season

Hurricane Beulah was an intense Category 5 hurricane which impacted the Greater Antilles, Mexico, and Texas in September 1967. The second tropical storm, second hurricane, only major hurricane, and strongest storm in the 1967 Atlantic hurricane season, Beulah tracked through the Caribbean, struck the Yucatán Peninsula of Mexico as a major hurricane, and moved west-northwestward into the Gulf of Mexico, briefly becoming a Category 5 hurricane. The hurricane made landfall just north of the mouth of the Rio Grande as a Category 3 hurricane. It spawned 115 tornadoes across Texas, which established a new record for the highest amount of tornadoes produced by a tropical cyclone, which stood until 2004. Due to its slow movement over Texas, Beulah led to significant flooding. Throughout its path, at least 59 people were killed and total damage reached $234.6 million (1967 USD), of which $200 million occurred in the United States, $26.9 million occurred in Mexico, and $7.65 million occurred in the eastern Caribbean.

== Meteorological history ==
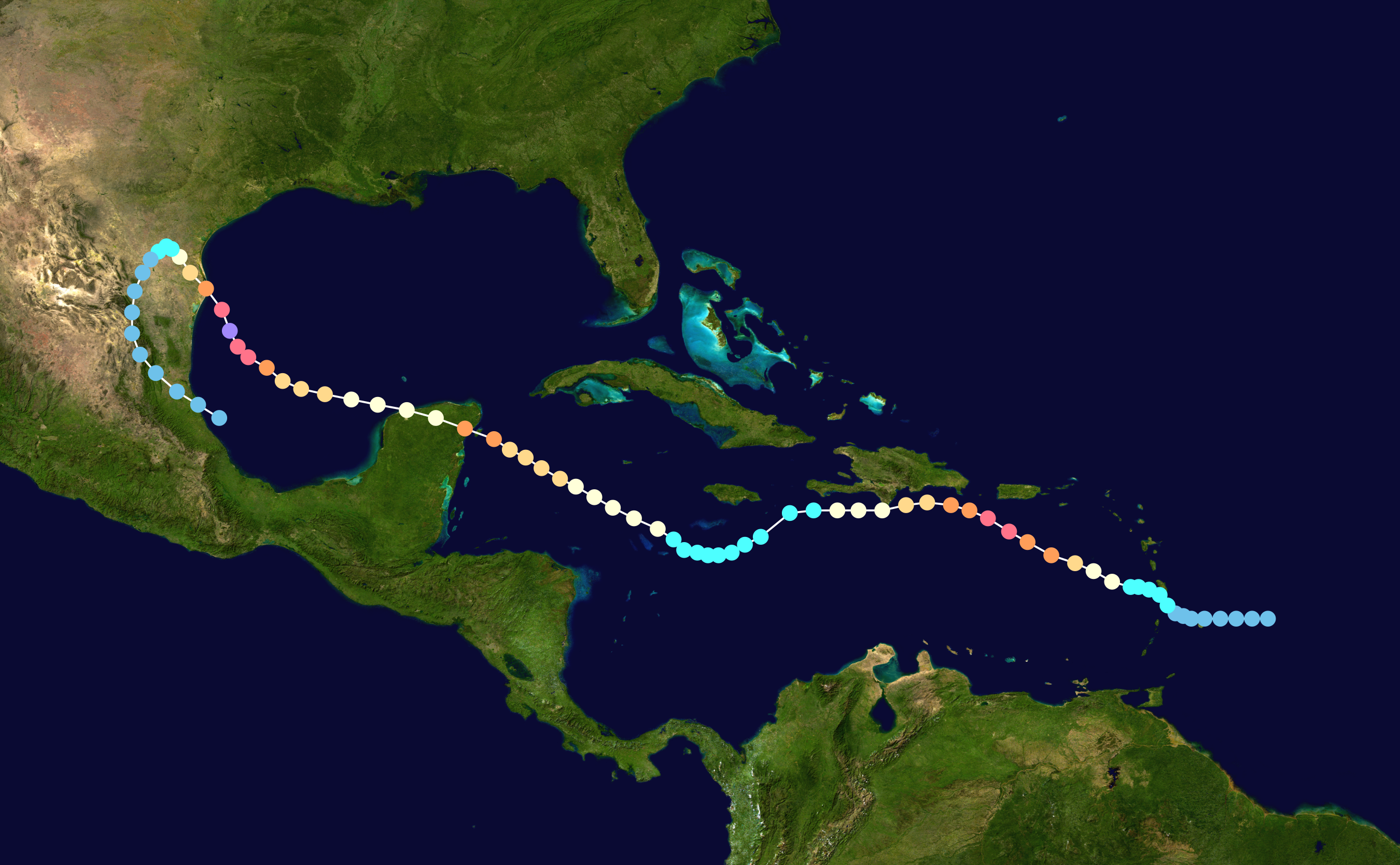
Map plotting the storm's track and intensity, according to the Saffir–Simpson scale Map key Saffir–Simpson scale Tropical depression (≤38 mph, ≤62 km/h) Tropical storm (39–73 mph, 63–118 km/h) Category 1 (74–95 mph, 119–153 km/h) Category 2 (96–110 mph, 154–177 km/h) Category 3 (111–129 mph, 178–208 km/h) Category 4 (130–156 mph, 209–251 km/h) Category 5 (≥157 mph, ≥252 km/h) Unknown Storm type Tropical cyclone Subtropical cyclone Extratropical cyclone, remnant low, tropical disturbance, or monsoon depression

On August 22, 1967, an ESSA-5 satellite image depicted an area of enhanced convection—shower and thunderstorm activity—east of the Western High Plateau in Cameroon over central Africa. Reaching the western slopes of the mountains two days later, the tropical wave became more coherent with clouds condensing along its axis. As it moved over west Africa, cyclonic rotation became apparent about 2,000 ft (610 m) above the surface. A research paper published in 1969 refers to the disturbance as a depression as it neared the west coast of Africa; however, this significantly differs from the official Atlantic hurricane database, which does not mention the system at that time, as a surface circulation likely did not exist. Regardless, the system emerged over the Atlantic Ocean around 12°N on August 28, as represented by barometric pressure falls in Dakar, Senegal. Once over water, the system interacted with the Intertropical Convergence Zone and continued westward along an undulating path with no further organization. It was not until a United States Navy weather reconnaissance plane flew into the disturbance on September 4, while it was located east of the Lesser Antilles, that signs of development were apparent. Corresponding observations from ships in the region on September 5 confirmed the existence of a 1010 mbar (hPa; 29.83 inHg) low-pressure area. In light of this, the disturbance was classified as a tropical depression at 12:00 UTC that day, with its center situated roughly 175 mi (282 km) east-northeast of Barbados.

A slow-moving system, the depression steadily organized as it approached the Lesser Antilles. Observations from aircraft reconnaissance indicated that the system attained gale-force winds by 12:00 UTC on September 7, resulting in its upgrade to a tropical storm. It was also assigned the name Beulah, making it the second named storm of the 1967 season. Shortly after being named, Beulah clipped the southern coast of Martinique and entered the eastern Caribbean. Feeding off the warm waters of the Caribbean, the cyclone quickly strengthened and reached Category 1 hurricane intensity by 18:00 UTC on September 8. Rapid deepening ensued thereafter, with the storm's central pressure falling to 940 mbar (hPa; 27.76 inHg) the following day, as it passed 100 mi (160 km) south of Puerto Rico. At this time, 1-minute sustained winds were estimated to be at least 140 mph (230 km/h), ranking Beulah as a Category 4 hurricane on the Saffir–Simpson hurricane scale (SSHS). Upon reaching this strength, weather radar imagery from San Juan, Puerto Rico showed that Beulah featured a 15 mi (24 km) wide eye, surrounded by an intense eyewall about 8 mi (13 km) thick.

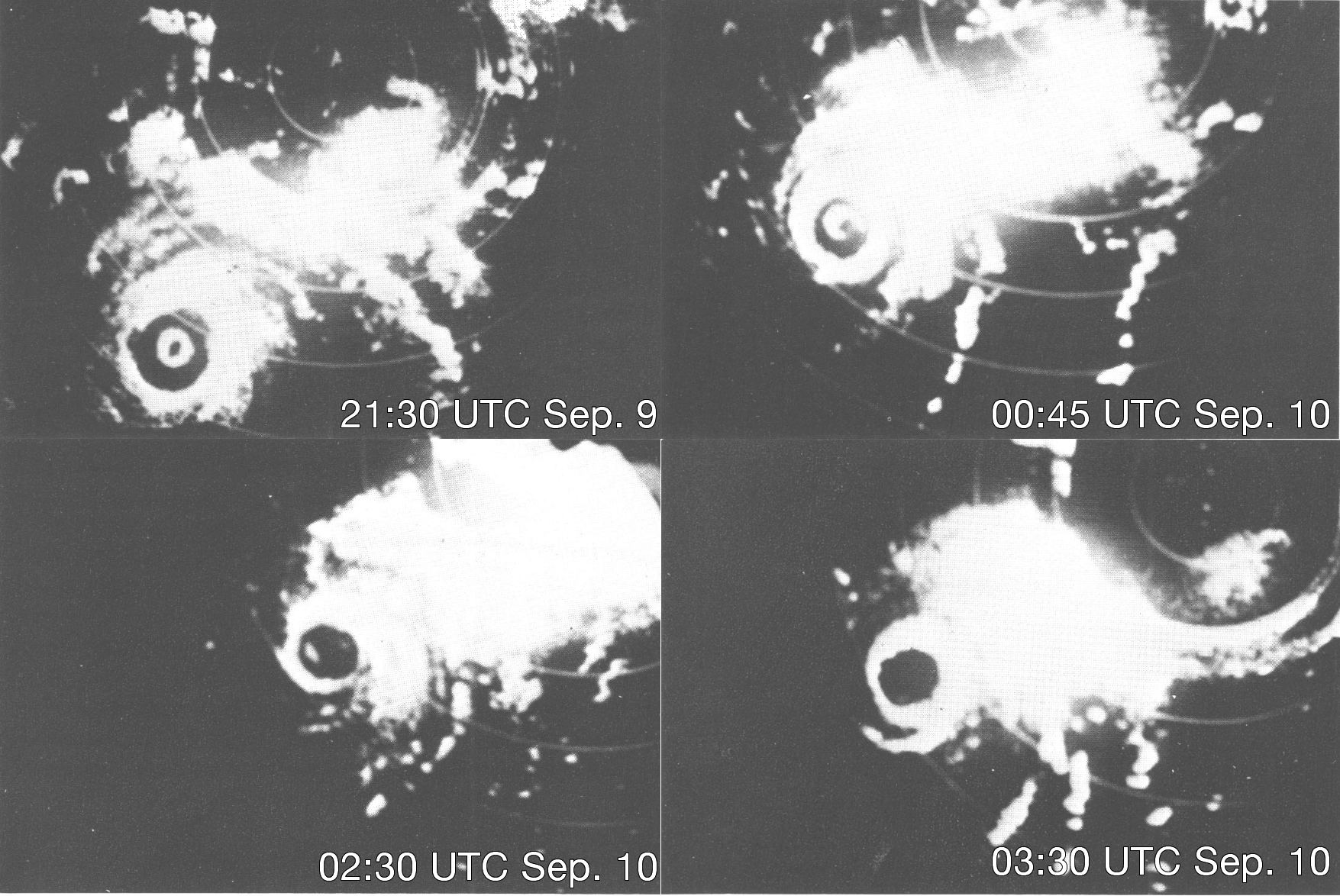
Radar images of Hurricane Beulah from 21:30 UTC on September 9 to 03:30 UTC on September 10, depicting its eyewall replacement cycle

During the evening of September 9, Beulah turned westward as weak ridge developed over the Bahamas, between it and the newly formed Tropical Storm Doria. The powerful storm weakened somewhat as an eyewall replacement cycle began to take shape. During this phase, the inner-eye of Beulah contracted to roughly 3–4 mi (4.8–6.4 km) in diameter while a second eyewall spanned an area 28 mi (45 km) across. The smaller eye soon dissipated, and the larger one became the single, dominant feature by the morning of September 10. The completion of this process marked the first time that an eyewall replacement cycle was observed in its entirety. The aforementioned westward turn placed the Dominican Republic in the line of danger, an area still reeling from the devastating effects of Hurricane Inez just one year prior. However, the storm unexpectedly collapsed as it approached the Barahona Peninsula and struck the area as a greatly weakened, though still significant, Category 1 hurricane, with estimated winds of 90 mph (140 km/h) around 18:00 UTC on September 11.

Skirting the southern coast of Haiti's Tiburon Peninsula, Beulah further degraded to a tropical storm by the morning of September 12. Unseasonably strong wind shear associated with the jet stream, resulting from an upper-level trough to the north, and the cyclone's interaction with land were responsible for the dramatic degradation. By the time it had cleared Haiti, Beulah was no more than a minimal tropical storm, with sustained winds near 40 mph (64 km/h). The storm's central pressure had also risen by roughly 60 mbar (hPa; 1.77 inHg) to 1000 mbar (hPa; 29.53 inHg). Originally seen as a threat to Jamaica, northeasterly flow induced a southerly component to the track and pushed the cyclone south of the island on September 13. The shear previously impeding organization abated on September 14, and a ridge re-established itself to Beulah's north, allowing the storm to resume a west-northwest to northwest track. The upper-level changes led to a favorable environment for intensification, and Beulah regained hurricane strength by 12:00 UTC on September 14, while located about 425 mi (684 km) south-southeast of Havana, Cuba.

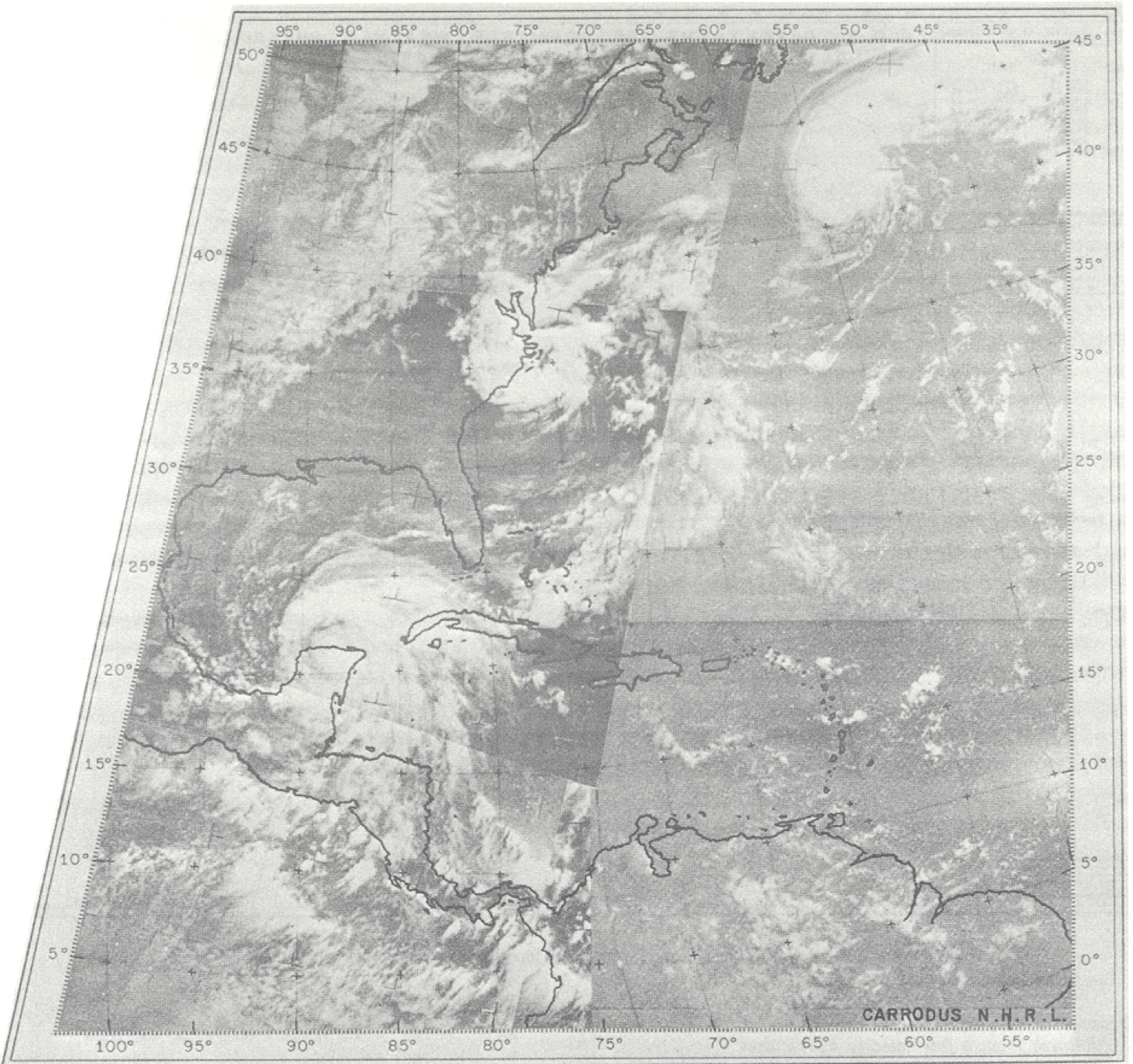
Composite of ESSA-2 photographs showing hurricanes Beulah (bottom), Doria (middle), and Chloe (top), on September 17

Moving through the climatologically favorable western Caribbean, Beulah quickly regained Category 3 major hurricane status on September 15, with 1-minute sustained winds estimated at 115 mph (185 km/h). The storm's central pressure fell to 964 mbar (964 hPa; 28.5 inHg) on September 16, before some weakening took place. Beulah ultimately made landfall on Cozumel Island, with winds of at least 100 mph (160 km/h) later that day, and struck the mainland Yucatán Peninsula hours later. Despite moving over land, little weakening took place by the time the hurricane emerged over the Gulf of Mexico about 24 hours later. The hurricane maintained its intensity throughout September 18, as it moved west-northwest to southern Tamaulipas, Mexico. However, on September 19, a pronounced phase of rapid intensification, took place as Beulah turned northwest to the Rio Grande Valley region. Aircraft reconnaissance throughout the day found falling pressures and ultimately measured a value of 923 mbar (hPa; 27.26 inHg) around 18:00 UTC. This was the second-lowest pressure ever recorded by aircraft at the time, behind a 920 mbar (hPa; 27.17 inHg) measurement in Hurricane Hattie of 1961. Beulah was estimated to have achieved its peak intensity shortly thereafter, as a Category 5 hurricane with maximum 1-minute sustained winds estimated at 160 mph (260 km/h).

Regarded as the third-largest hurricane on record at the time, Beulah moved along a slowing, erratic, and somewhat cycloidal path. Slight weakening ensued as it neared land and Beulah ultimately made its final landfall south of Brownsville, Texas, near the mouth of the Rio Grande around 13:00 UTC on September 20. No direct measurements exist at the core of the hurricane as it moved ashore; however, based on a minimum pressure of 951 mbar (hPa; 28.08 inHg) in Brownsville, the hurricane likely struck land with a central pressure below that value. A vessel anchored in the Port of Brownsville measured peak wind gusts of 136 mph (219 km/h), equivalent to a low-end Category 4 hurricane. According to the National Hurricane Center, Beulah struck as a Category 3 hurricane, and was originally thought to have had a central pressure of 950 mbar (hPa; 28.05 inHg) at landfall, but a 2020 re-evaluation as part of the Atlantic hurricane reanalysis project lowered this to 940 mbar (27.76 inHg). Once over land, the hurricane slowly weakened as it remained relatively close to the coast. Sustained winds dropped below hurricane-force on September 21, roughly 24 hours after landfall. The system subsequently stalled near Alice, Texas, before turning to the southwest. It was initially thought that, after diminishing to a tropical depression late on September 22, Beulah's circulation finally dissipated over the mountainous terrain of Nuevo León, Mexico; however, the 2020 reanalysis concluded that Beulah survived through at least September 24, when it reemerged into the Gulf of Mexico, crossing the Mexican coast between the cities of Tampico and Tuxpan. Due to a lack of suitable observations, it is unknown how much longer after this Beulah continued to exist as a tropical depression over the southern Gulf of Mexico before degenerating into an open trough.

== Preparations ==
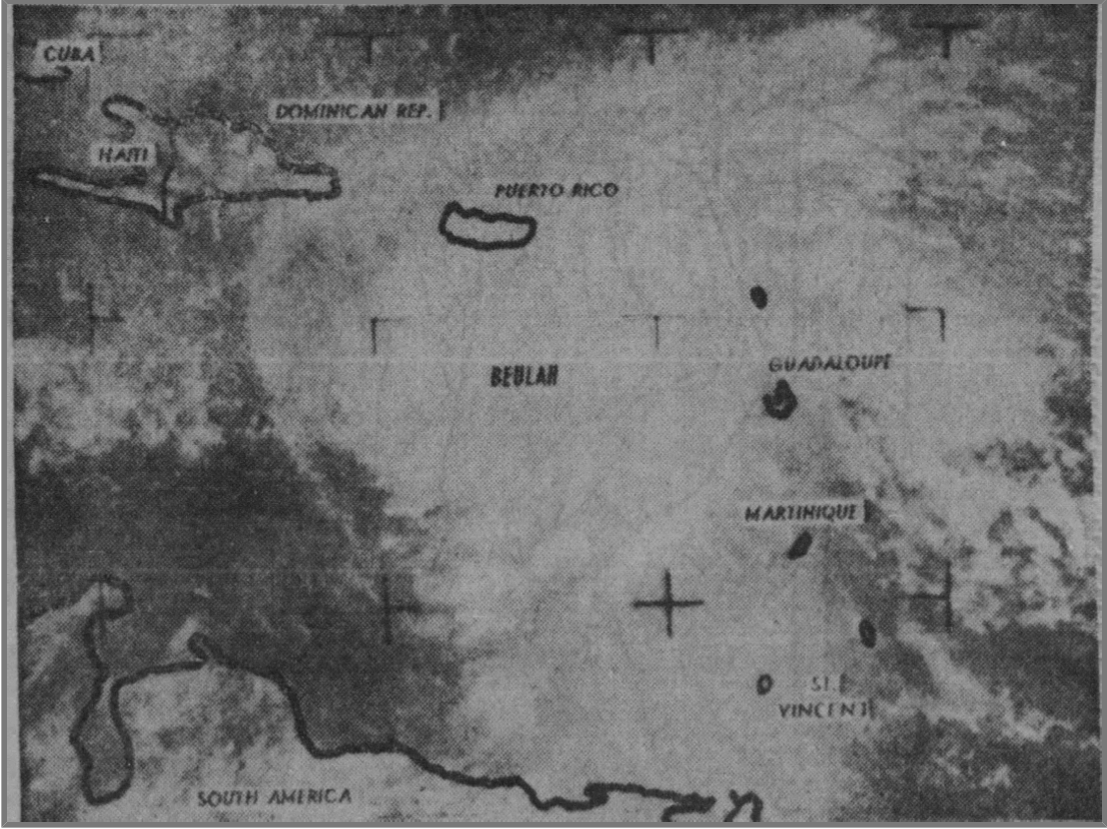
NIMBUS satellite image of Hurricane Beulah over the Eastern Caribbean on September 9

=== Hispaniola ===
Following Beulah's rapid intensification on September 9, a hurricane watch was issued for the whole of Hispaniola on September 9, with emphasis on a threat to the southern coast. Warnings were soon raised for areas between Barahona and Cabo Engaño in the Dominican Republic.

Across the Dominican Republic, an estimated 200,000 people evacuated from coastal areas.

=== United States ===
Beginning on the afternoon of September 17, people were advised to remain off the beaches of Padre, Mustang, and St. Joseph Islands. Immediate evacuation of Port Aransas and Mustang, Padre, and St. Joseph Islands was advised on the morning of September 19. Most residents and others on the islands evacuated, including the personnel of Padre Island National Seashore. About 40 persons remained on the islands, including about 20 at Port Aransas. Immediate evacuation of Rockport and Live Oak and Lamar Peninsulas was advised in the evening of September 19. These areas and the towns of Ingleside and Aransas Pass were nearly completely evacuated. About 50 persons remained in Rockport. The evacuation of the University of Corpus Christi was advised on the morning of September 20, and Corpus Christi Beach and parts of Flour Bluff were also evacuated. During the storm there were 30,000 people in shelters in Nueces and San Patricio Counties, including 6,000 in Corpus Christi.

== Impact ==
=== Eastern Caribbean ===
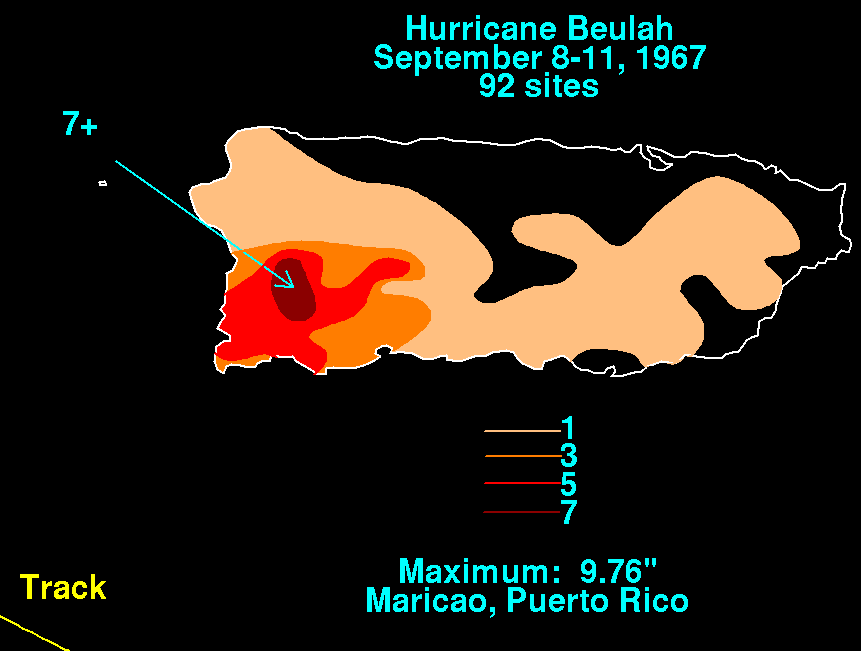
Rainfall from Hurricane Beulah in Puerto Rico

Prior to Beulah, a stationary trough over the Lesser Antilles produced torrential rainfall throughout the region, setting the stage for significant flooding. On September 7, Beulah brought torrential rains to the already saturated region, with reports of more than 10 in (250 mm) received by the Weather Bureau. The French West Indies, and especially Martinique, suffering the brunt of the storm. During an 18‑hour span, 11.85 in (301 mm) fell on the island. Severe flooding claimed 15 lives on Martinique and destroyed many homes. Parts of Fort-de-France were inundated by 3 ft (0.91 m) of water while the Martinique International Airport saw 1 ft (0.30 m) of flooding. The banana crop sustained extensive losses. Across the island nearly 1,000 residents were left homeless, including 400 in Fort-de-France. Damage on the island amounted to $4.5 million. Supplies of fresh water were severely limited for two days following the storm.

Heavy rains triggered flooding and landslides across St. Vincent, blocking numerous roads and causing some damage. Two children were killed after a boulder, dislodged by the rains, crashed into their home. Damage on St. Lucia reached $3 million, mainly stemming from the banana crop which was largely ruined. The periphery of the hurricane brought rainfall primarily to southwestern Puerto Rico, where a maximum of 9.76 inches (248 mm) fell at Maricao. One person lost their life on the island and damage was a minimal $150,000.

Owing to effective evacuations, only two people lost their lives in the Dominican Republic. The core of Beulah impacted areas devastated by Hurricane Inez a year prior, leaving extensive damage in its wake. Media reports indicated that more than 1,000 people were left homeless across the Barahona Peninsula. Flash flooding affected the southern coasts of both the Dominican Republic and Haiti.

Beulah had limited impact on Jamaica as it brushed the island as a weak tropical storm. According to newspapers, gale-force winds affected the nation though there were no reports of damage.

=== Mexico ===
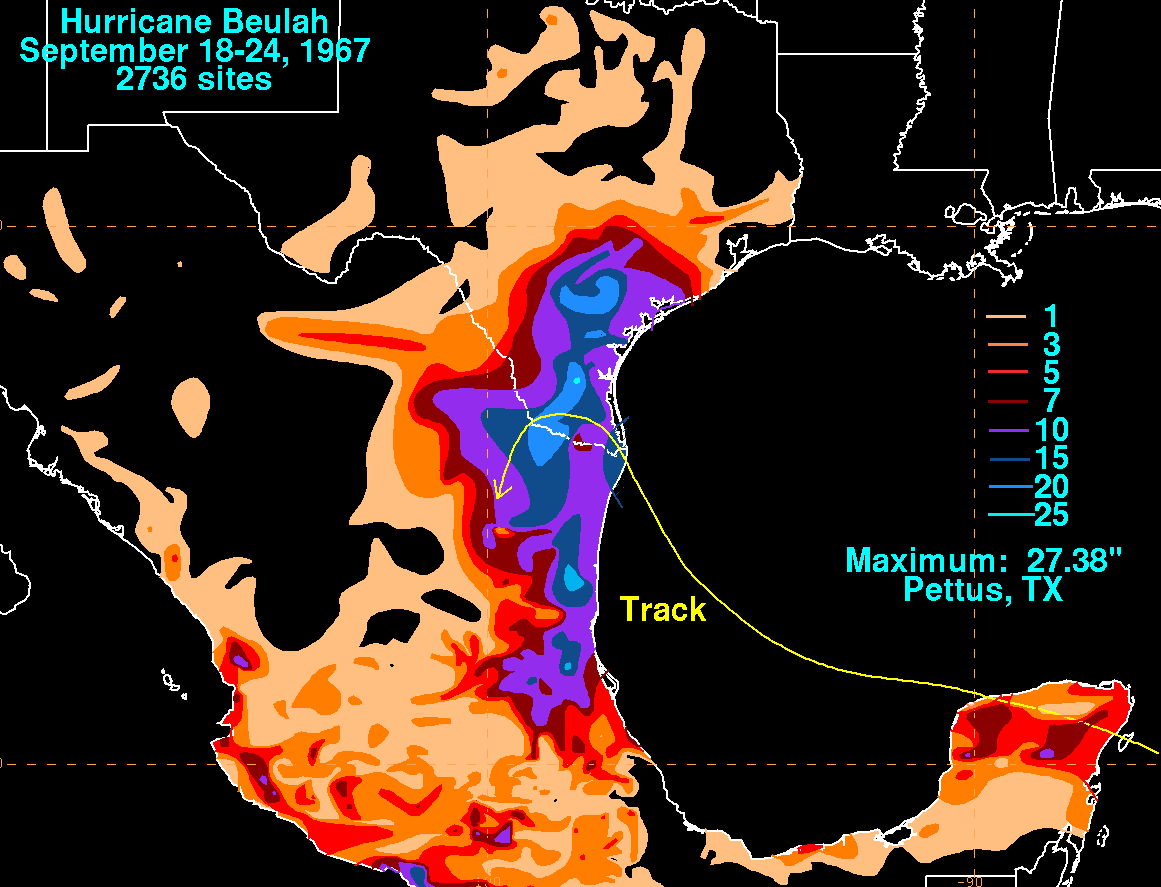
Rainfall from Hurricane Beulah across Mexico and Texas

Striking Cozumel Island and the Yucatán Peninsula on September 17 as a Category 2 hurricane, Beulah caused considerable damage and killed 11 people across the region. Wind gusts up to 125 mph (201 km/h) severed communication lines, downed power lines and felled trees. The Puerto Morelos lighthouse on the Riviera Maya was undermined by the storm; it was never torn down and the leaning tower remains a tourist attraction in the area. In Mérida, Yucatán, winds were recorded up to 75 mph (121 km/h). Under the force of the powerful winds, several structures collapsed across the Peninsula, resulting in six fatalities. Nearly every buildings on Cozumel Island sustained damage, roughly half of which lost their roofs. Four people were also killed in Playa del Carmen. Along the coast, Beulah's storm surge flooded areas within 600 yd (550 m) of the coastline, washing out roads and leaving "graveyards of boats." Throughout the Yucatán Peninsula, an estimated 5,000 people were left homeless and at least 30,000 were affected by the storm.

Throughout Mexico, Beulah killed 19 people. Economic losses across Tampico reached 500 million pesos. Across the Yucatán Peninsula, the Government of Mexico set up an air lift of food and medical supplies to isolated areas by September 18.

=== United States ===
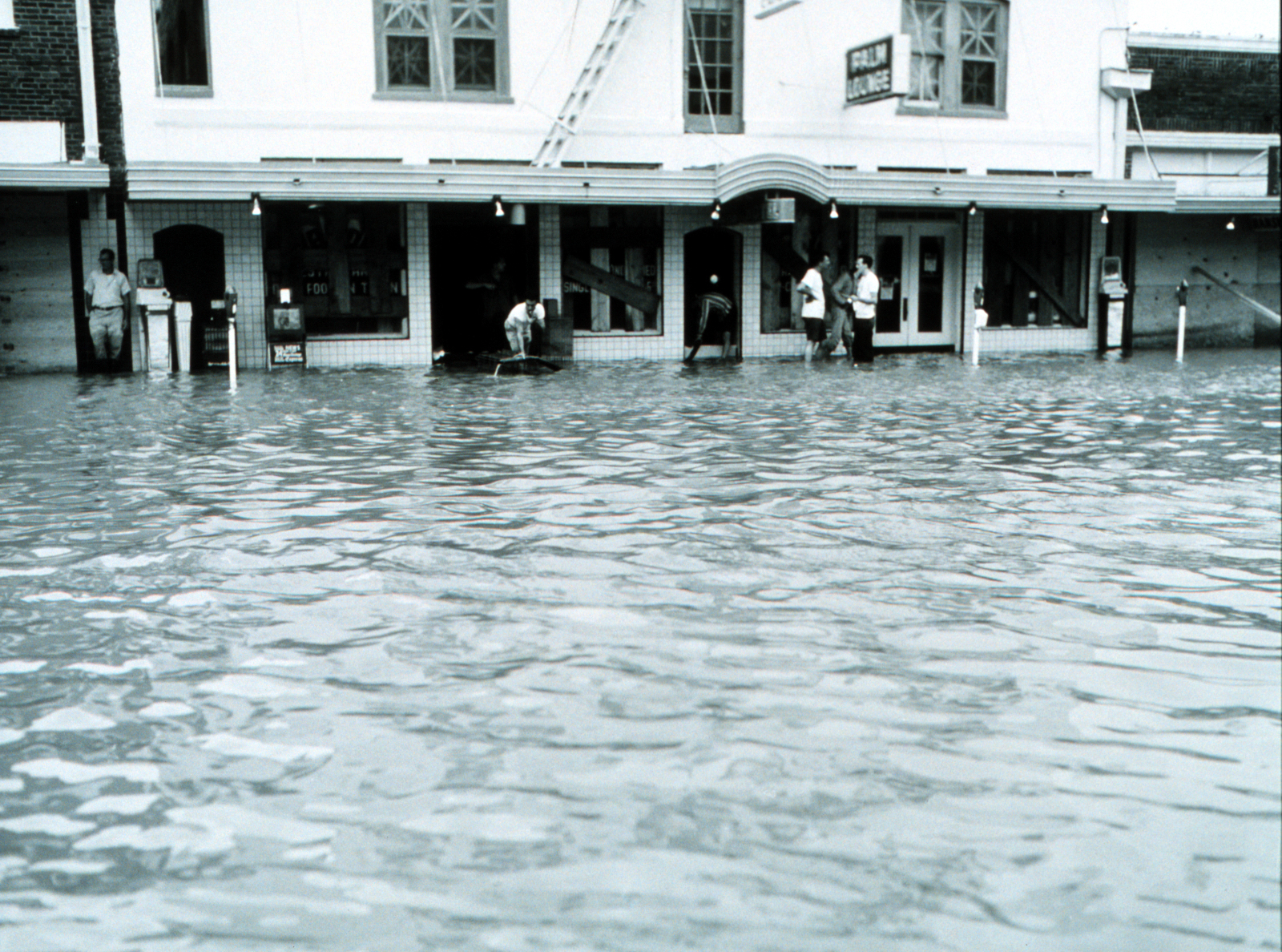
Damage and Flooding in Brownsville, Texas from Hurricane Beulah.

In Texas the Lower Rio Grande Valley, the four-county region that comprises deep south Texas, was inundated with torrential rains and compound flooding effects. Within a 36‑hour period, the hurricane dropped over 27 inches (690 mm) of rain near Beeville, Texas. Falfurrias received more rain from Beulah than it normally records during one year. Areas south of Laredo, San Antonio, and Matagorda were isolated for more than a week due to the resulting flood. At Fort Ringgold, Rio Grande City, the Public Health Service coordinated an emergency hospital. It served, among others, patients airlifted from Mexico. On September 28, President Lyndon B Johnson declared twenty-four counties in southern Texas a disaster area.

Hurricane Beulah produced 9.4 feet (2.9 m) of storm tide surge, crossing North Padre Island at Nueces County Park No. 1. The storm also caused 31 cuts through Padre Island, all occurring south of a point 30 miles south of Corpus Christi. The height of the storm surge diminished near South Padre Island toward Port Isabel, Texas, where flooding from tides ranged from 4.7 to 8 ft. The highest sustained wind was 136 miles per hour (219 km/h), reported aboard the SS Shirley Lykes, which was anchored in the Port of Brownsville. Winds as high as 109 mph (175 km/h) were measured at the Brownsville National Weather Service office at landfall. Since the hurricane bent the anemometer 30 degrees from the vertical, it is possible the winds at Brownsville were underestimated. Gusts of over 100 mph (160 km/h) were recorded as far inland as the towns of McAllen, Edinburg, Mission, and Pharr, some 50 miles (80 km) from the gulf coast. Beulah spawned a record 115 tornadoes which destroyed homes, commercial property, and inflicted serious damage on the region's agricultural industry. The tornado record from Beulah would survive until Hurricane Ivan set a new record in 2004. The Rio Grande Valley's citrus industry, based on cultivation of the famous "Ruby Red" grapefruit, was particularly hard hit.

Animal life in the region responded in various ways to survive. Ants survived the floods by congregating in spheres of living colonies and floated down streams to safety. Predaceous beetle larvae preyed on frogs and rodents. Crustaceans from the beaches migrated en masse to the protection of high ground.

Hurricane Beulah caused an estimated US$200 million in damage. Sources report 15 total deaths in Texas from the storm.

== Retirement ==
Due to the number of fatalities and extensive damage the system caused from the Lesser Antilles to Texas, the name Beulah was retired following the 1967 season, and will never be used for an Atlantic basin tropical cyclone again. It was replaced with Beth for the 1971 season.

== See also ==
- List of Category 5 Atlantic hurricanes
- List of tornadoes spawned by tropical cyclones
- List of wettest tropical cyclones in Texas
- Hurricane Harvey (2017) – another hurricane that caused severe flooding in Texas
