= Puerto Morelos Lighthouse =

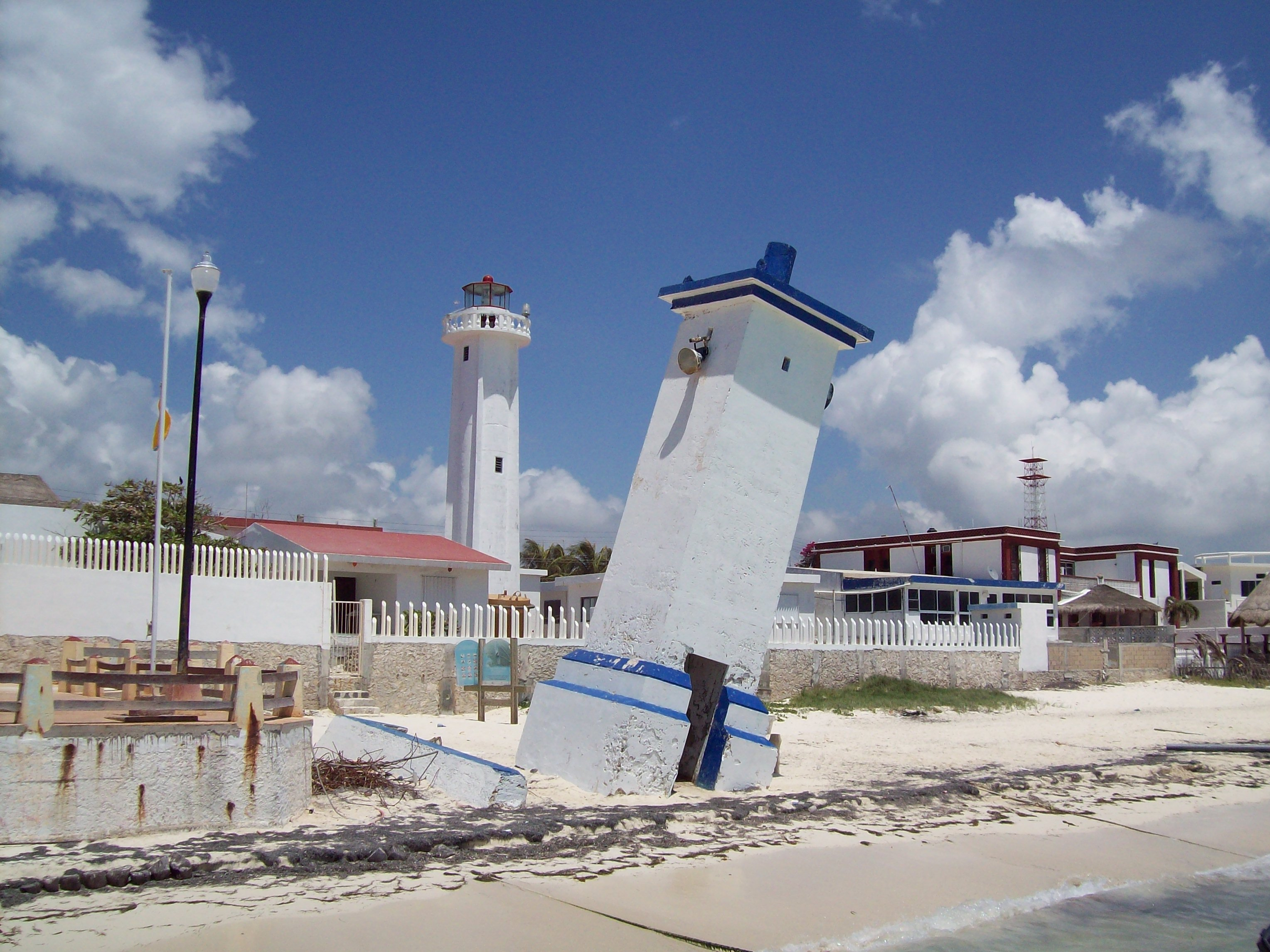
- Location: Puerto Morelos; Mexico
- Coordinates: 20.848037°N 86.875221°W

Tower
- Constructed: 1905 (first); 1946 (second)
- Construction: concrete tower
- Height: 14 metres (46 ft) (current); 10 metres (33 ft) (first)
- Shape: cylindrical tower with balcony and lantern
- Markings: white tower, red lantern
- Operator: Secretariat of Infrastructure, Communications and Transportation

Light
- First lit: 1968 (current)
- Focal height: 16 metres (52 ft)
- Range: 15 nautical miles (28 km; 17 mi)
- Characteristic: Fl W 6s.
- Mexico no.: CF-23-170

Puerto Morelos Lighthouse is an active lighthouse in the town and port of Puerto Morelos, on the Riviera Maya in the state of Quintana Roo, Mexico. The current lighthouse is the third in a succession of lights that have operated at the site on the seafront, close to the main pier. The second lighthouse, known as the Inclined Lighthouse (Spanish: Faro Inclinado), began tilting in 1967 and remains in place.

== History ==
Little is known about the original light when the station was started in 1905, but the second lighthouse built in 1946 is well known as the Faro Inclinado, and a symbol of the town.

The leaning tower was the result of the foundations being washed away by Hurricane Beulah in September 1967. The 10 metres (33 ft) high concrete structure, painted white with blue trim, now lies disused but has been kept as a testament to the storm, and as a local landmark.

The third lighthouse which was built in the 1980s but further back from the beach, was also damaged by another hurricane, this time by Wilma in 2005, with the top of the 14m high cylinder-shaped tower requiring repairs, and repainting. This current light has a focal height of 16m above sea level, with a range of 15 nautical miles and consists of a flash of white light every six seconds.

The lighthouse is operated and maintained by the Secretariat of Communications and Transportation, and is registered under the Admiralty number J4438 and has the NGA identifier of 110–15704.

== See also ==
- List of lighthouses in Mexico
