= Matamoros Lighthouse =

Defunct lighthouse in Puerto Vallarta, Jalisco, Mexico

Matamoros Lighthouse Faro de Matamoros
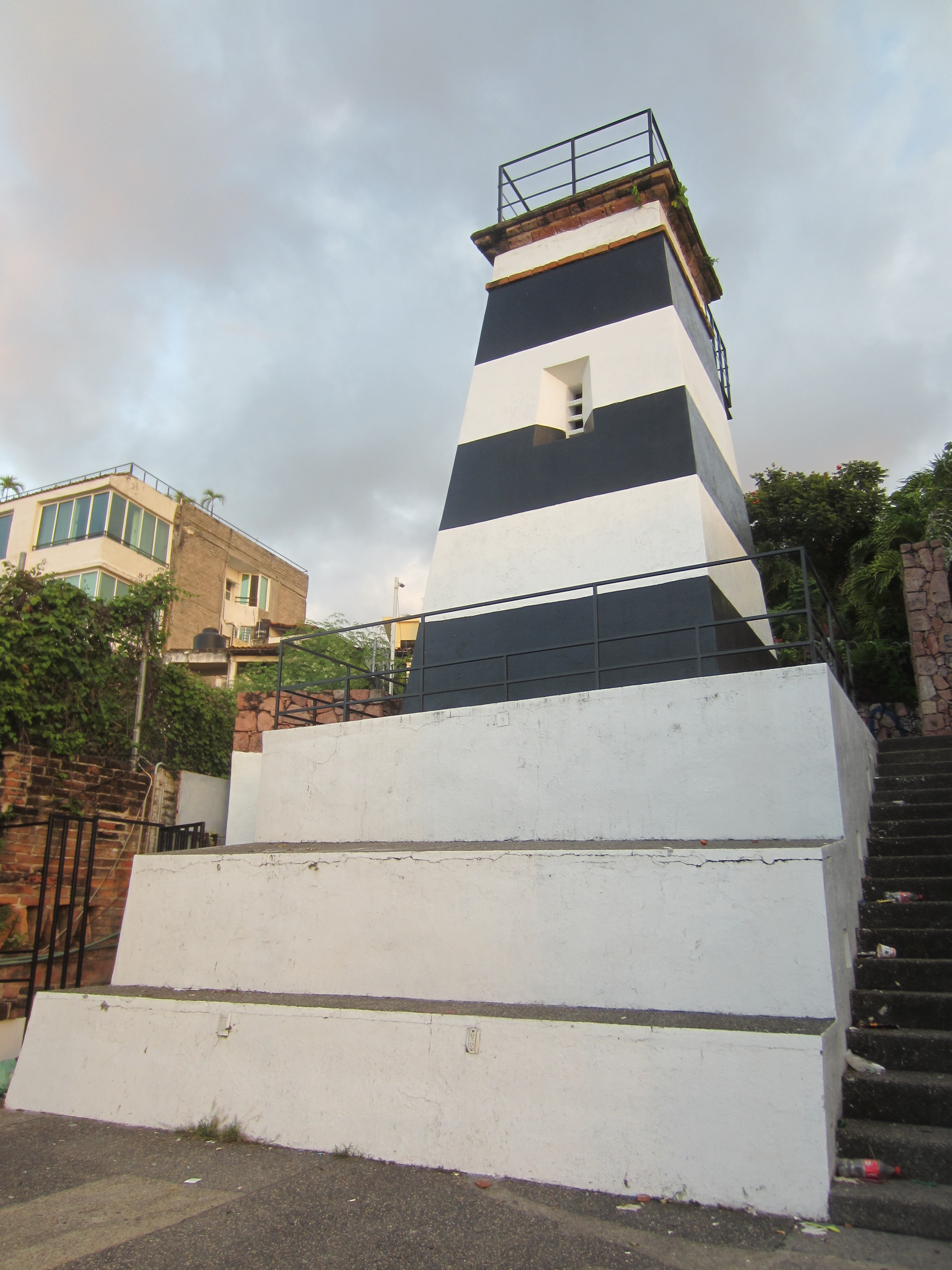
- Location: Puerto Vallarta, Jalisco, Mexico
- Coordinates: 20°36′33″N 105°14′01″W

Tower
- Constructed: 1932
- Height: 12 m (39 ft)
- Shape: square pyramid
- Markings: Black, white

Light
- First lit: 15 August 1932
- Deactivated: 20 August 1970

Matamoros Lighthouse (Spanish: Faro de Matamoros) is a defunct lighthouse along Matamoros Street, in colonia Centro, Puerto Vallarta, in the Mexican state of Jalisco. A beacon, the structure was built by Roberto Alcazar and inaugurated on August 15, 1932. It operated until June 1978, and upon retirement, was deemed a historic landmark.

In 2006, the structure was remodeled and converted into a lookout with stair access. The structure, now considered a tourist attraction, provides panoramic views of the city and Banderas Bay. It was cleaned and graffiti was removed in 2017.
