= Crestón Island =

Island off Mazatlán, Mexico

Native name: Isla del Crestón
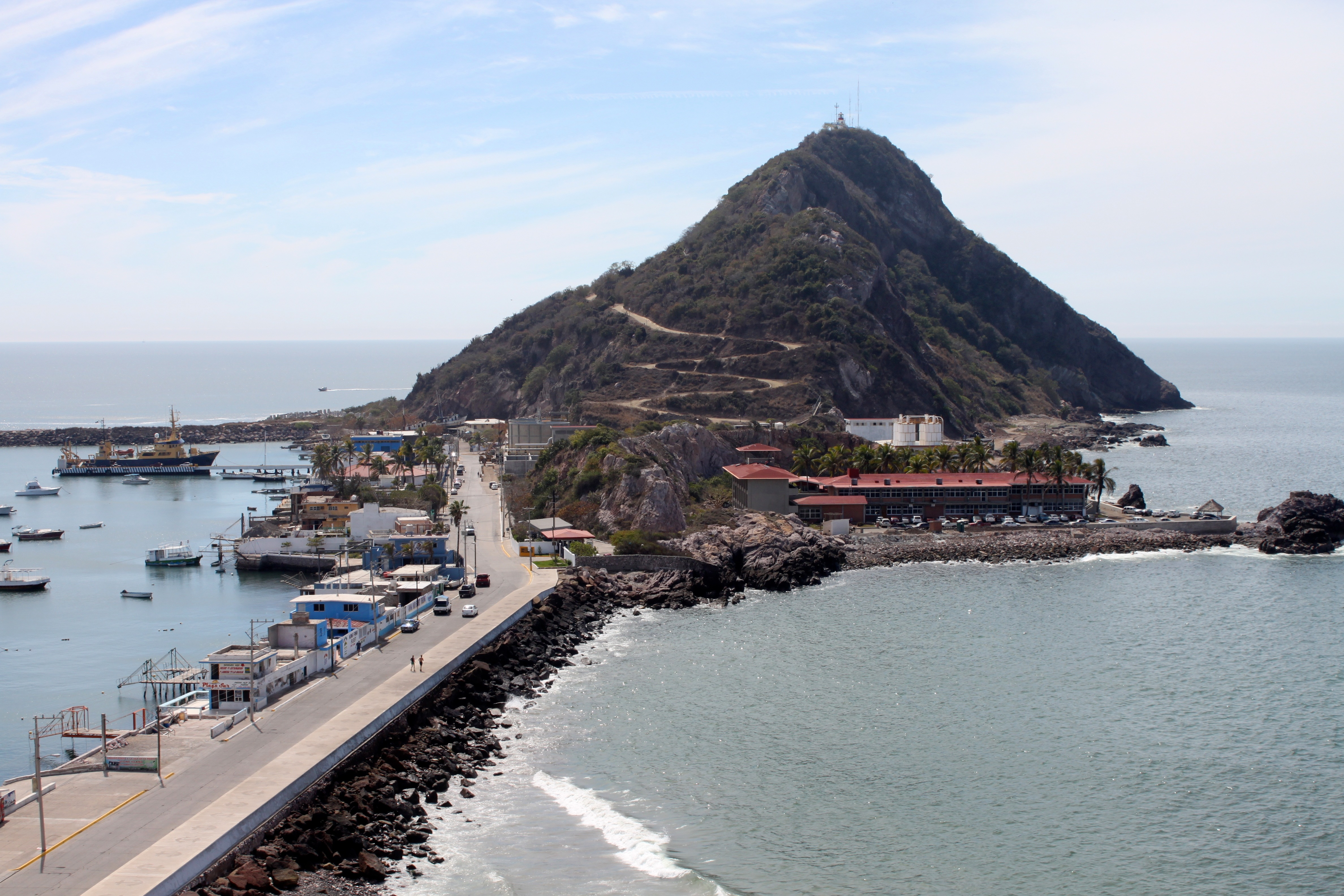
- Crestón Island

Geography
- Location: Pacific Ocean
- Coordinates: 23.177689°N 106.427381°W
- Length: 643 m (2110 ft)
- Width: 321 m (1053 ft)
- Highest point: 157 m

Administration
- Mexico
- State: Sinaloa
- Municipality: Mazatlán Municipality

Demographics
- Population: 0

Additional information
- Time zone: MST (UTC−7)
- Official website: https://www.faromazatlan.com/

Crestón Island or Crestón Hill is located in the southern part of the Mexican city of Mazatlán. It is 643 meters long and 321 meters wide. It is the highest point in the entire city.

== Geography ==
The tropical dry forest predominates on the island, with species that take advantage of the scarce rains, there are also small and medium-sized trees. Since August 2023, a specific registry of common arthropods has been carried out in the place. Most species identified through NaturaLista are insects and plants; but in third place are birds, which represent approximately one fifth of the species recorded in Sinaloa.

== History ==
Since 1828, the hill was used as a maritime marker with bonfires to guide ships entering or leaving the port. In 1879, an oil lamp made in France was purchased to improve the function of the campfire, but in 1905 it was replaced by the lighthouse that stands today. Starting in 1930, it stopped being an island, since a stone road was built that linked it with the city of Mazatlán. On December 14, 2024, was inaugurated a 1,265-meter zip line that connects Cerro del Crestón with Cerro del Vigía; the zip line is called "Farolesa", it is 157 meters above sea level and cost more than 40 million pesos; its inauguration was attended by the head of the Federal Tourism Secretariat, Josefina Rodríguez Zamora; the area will be reforested with 1000 trees.

== Faro Mazatlán ==
At the top of the mountain is the Faro Mazatlán, it is considered one of the highest lighthouses built on natural terrain in the world, at 157 meters above sea level. The path that reaches the top of the hill has 334 steps and measures 745 meters.

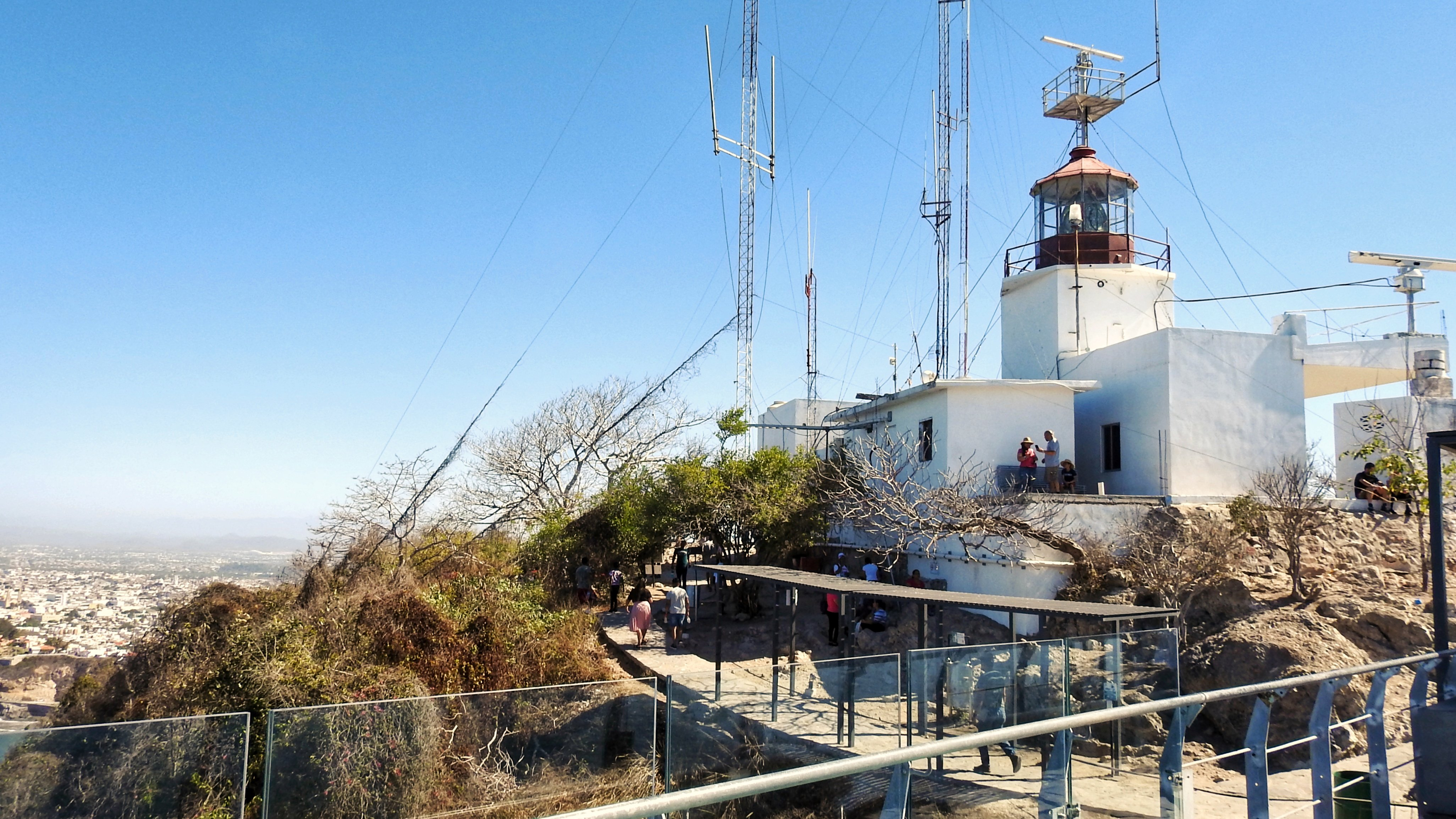
Faro Mazatlán

It is a highly visited site in the city, since the Faro Mazatlán Natural Park is located on the hill. In 2017, a glass bridge was built on the precipice of the hill, with a length of 30 meters, the glass has a thickness that resists up to 5 tons per square meter, the glass area is 18 meters. In April 2018, it opened to the public; people who enter the bridge are put on sticky plastic over their shoes, in order not to damage the glass.

== Incidents ==
On March 27, 2015, two brothers fell from the hill into the sea, one died and the other was reported missing.

On February 25, 2022, a 71-year-old Canadian tourist died of heat stroke followed by a sudden heart attack while trying to climb the mountain.

== Gallery ==
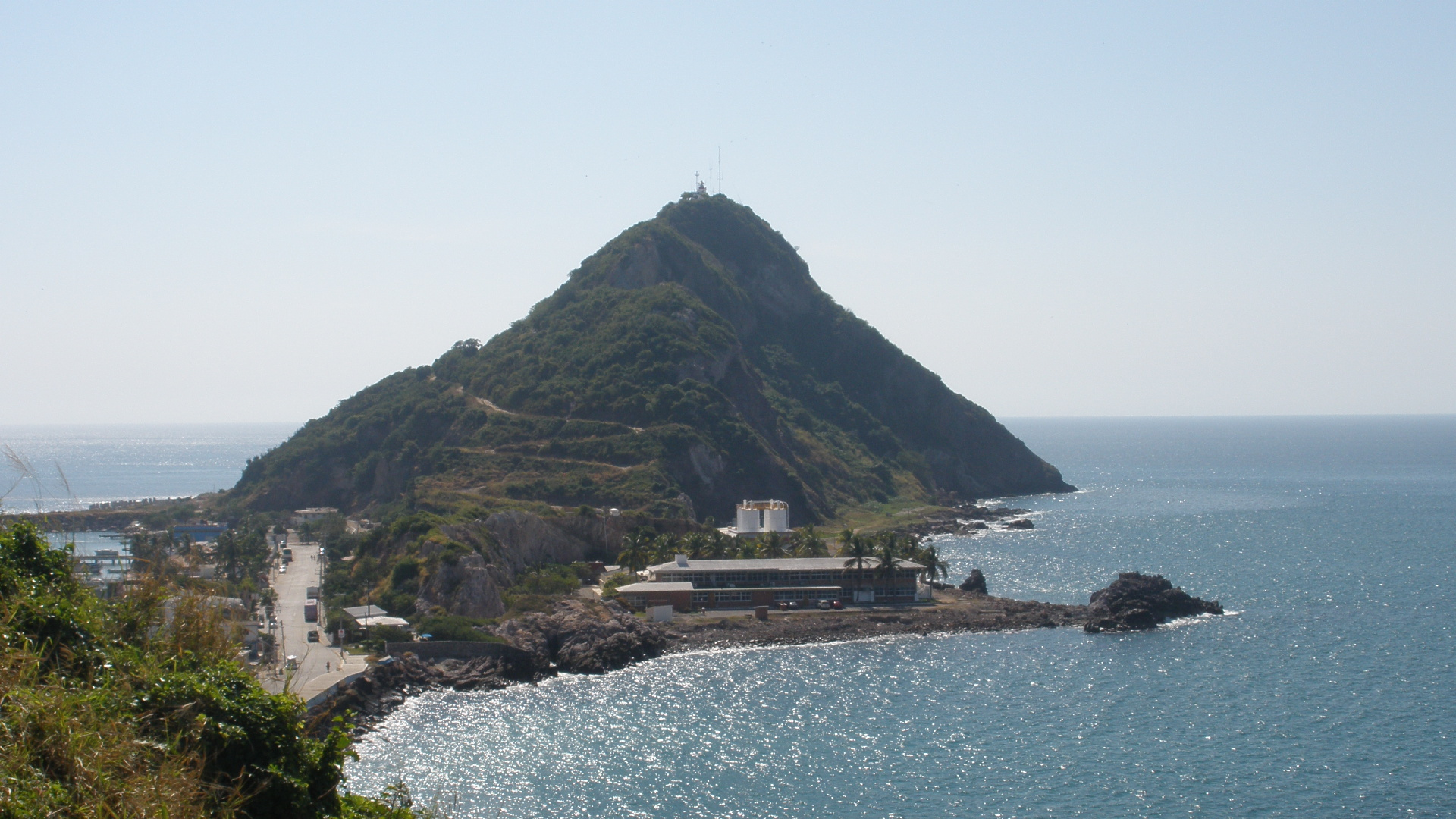
View of the hill

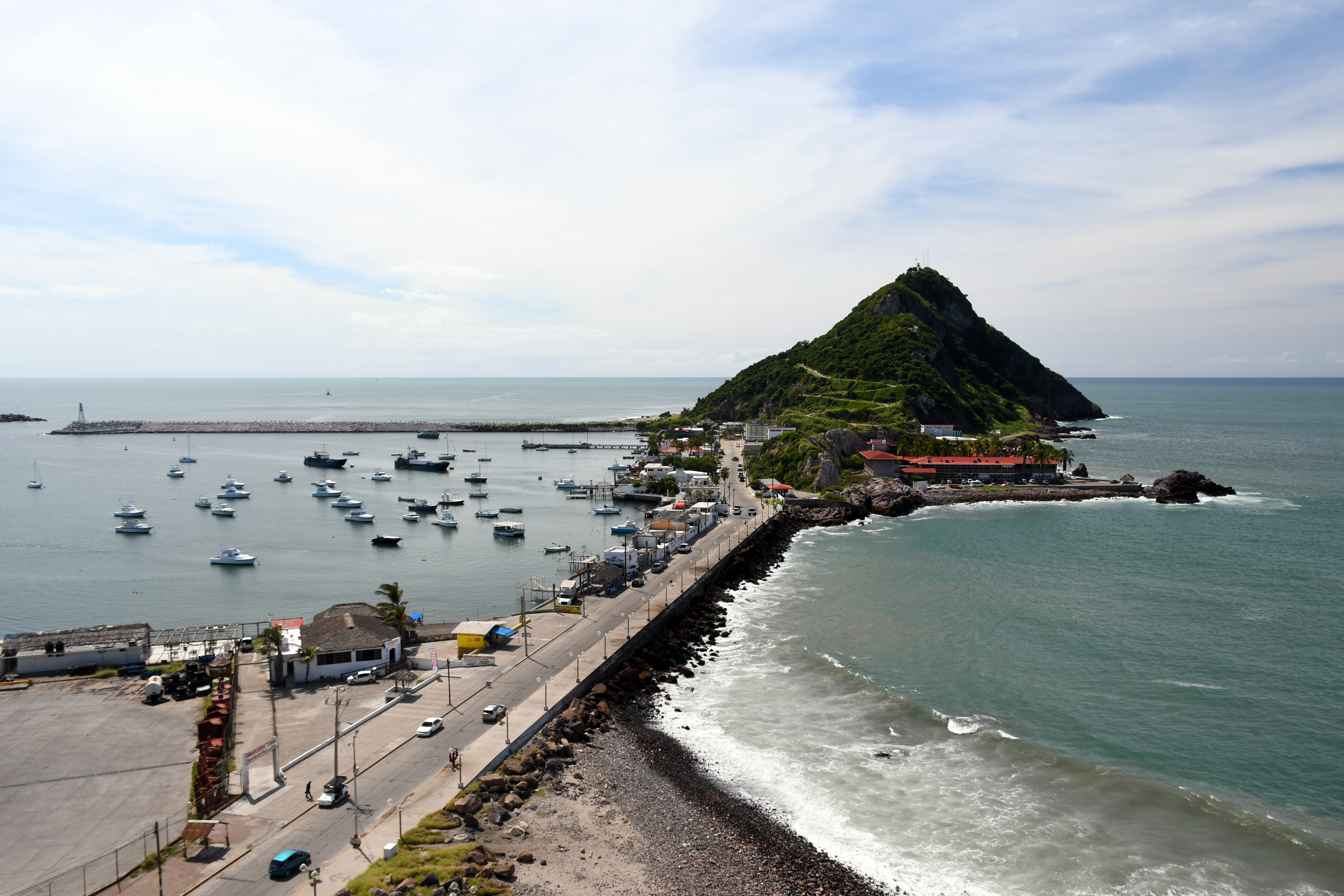
Bridge that connects the Cerro del Crestón with Mazatlán

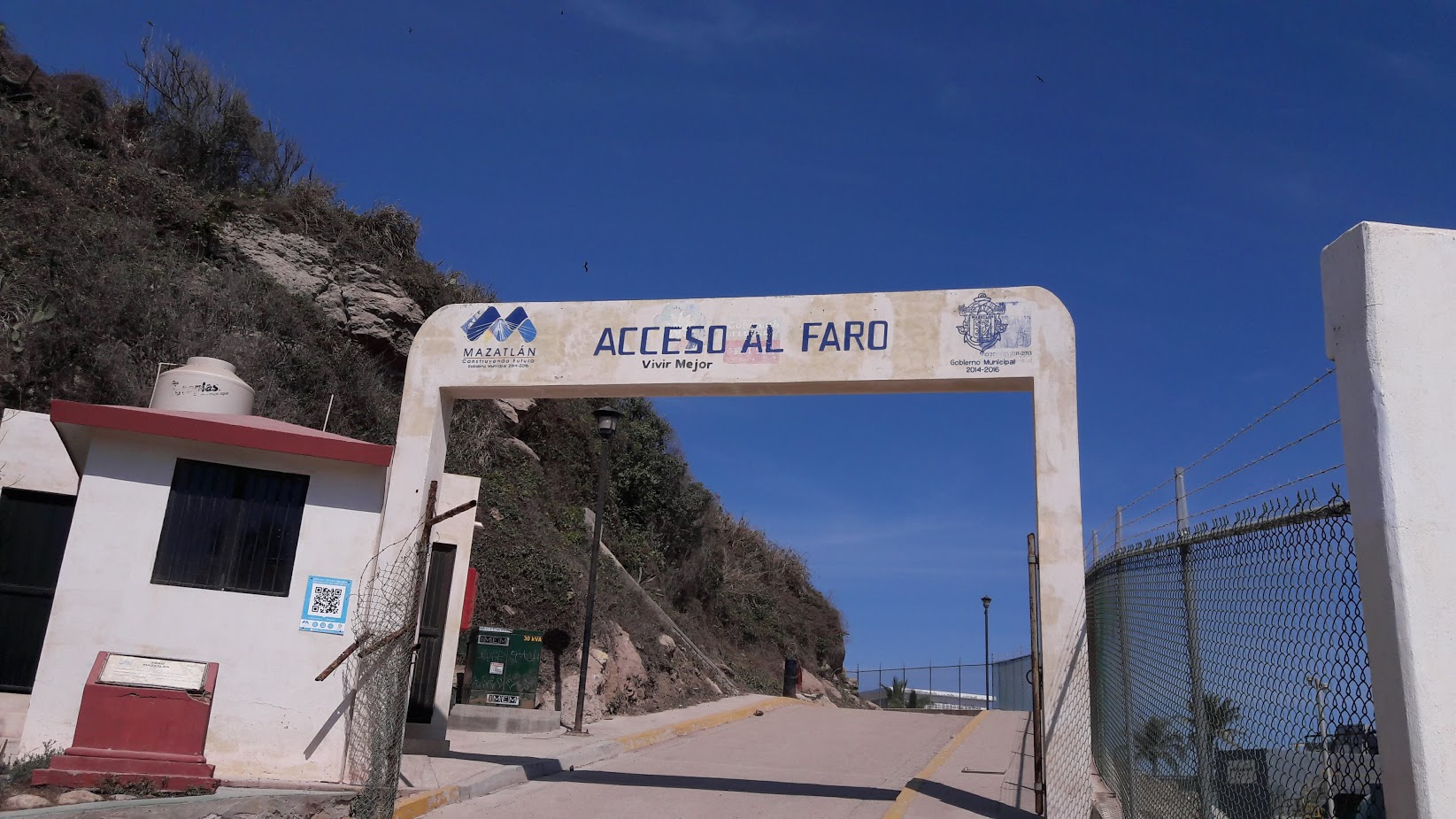
Access to the hill

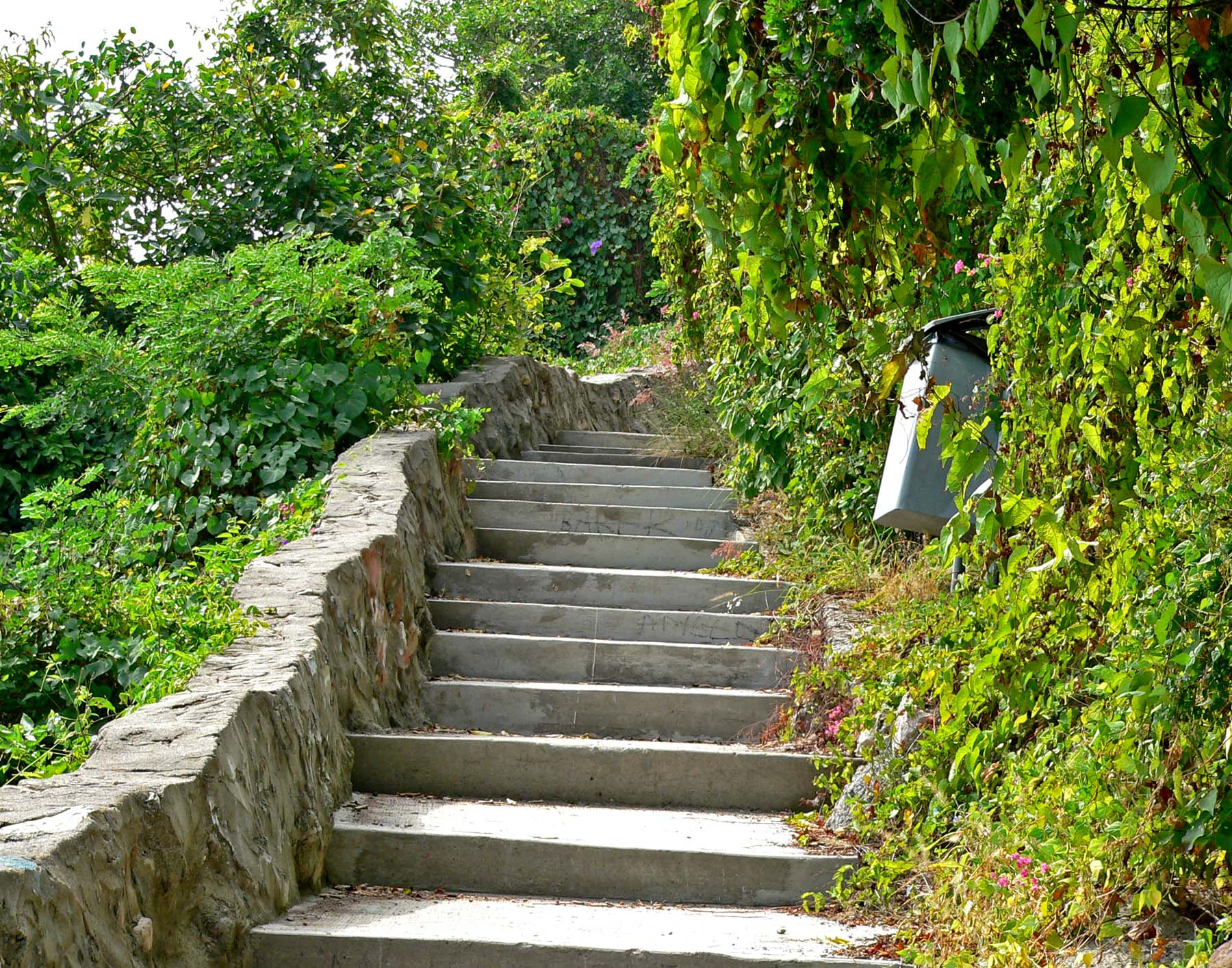
Trail to the lighthouse

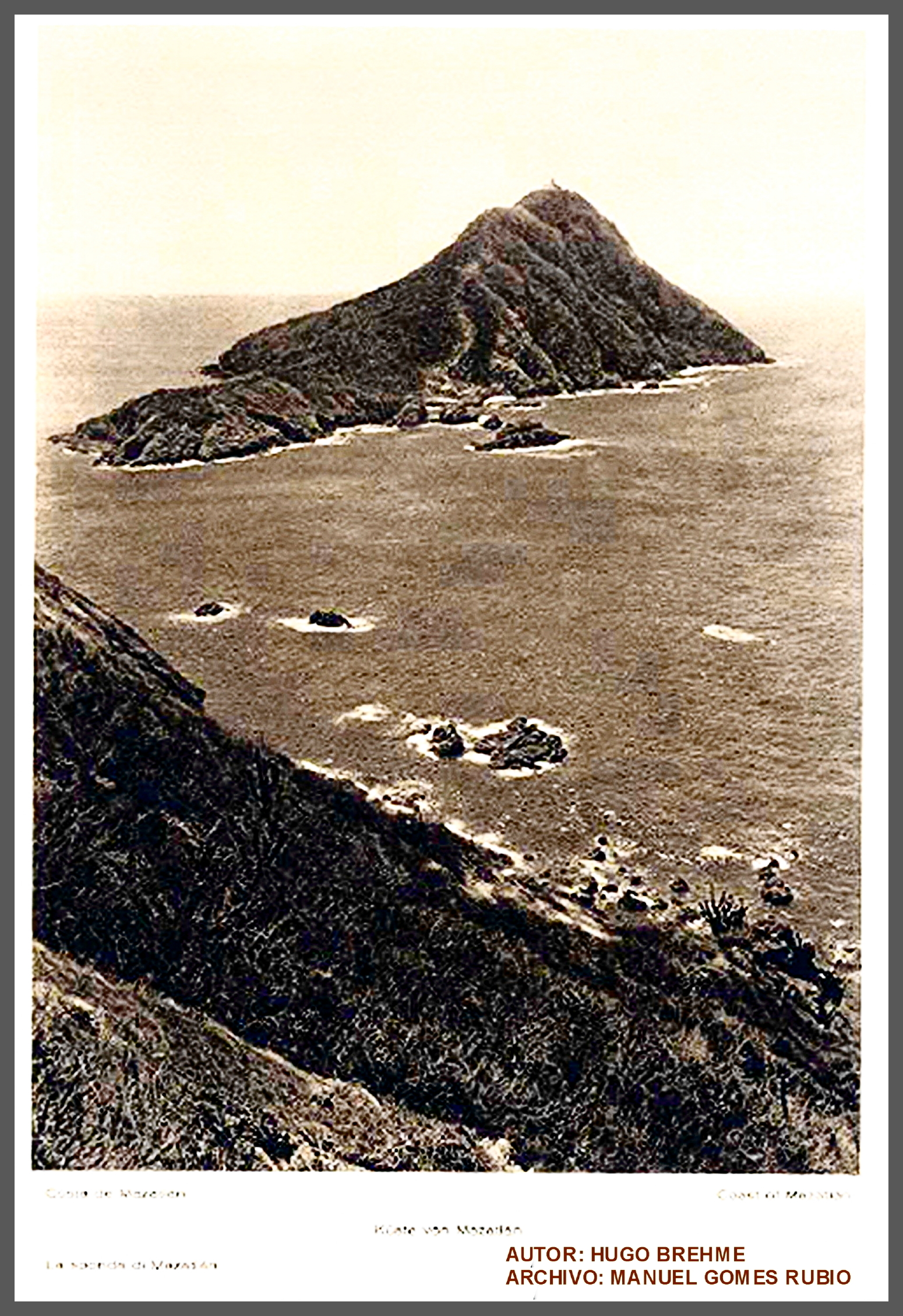
The Crestón Island probably at the beginning of the 20th century

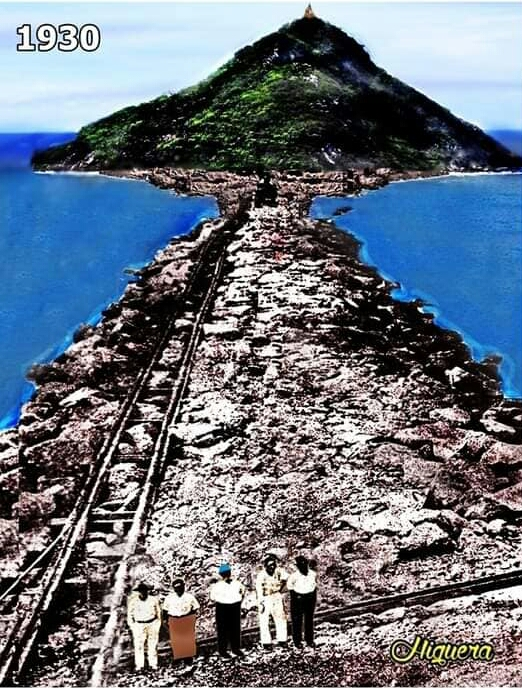
Construction of the bridge in 1930
