= Faro Mazatlán =

Lighthouse in Mazatlán, Sinaloa, Mexico

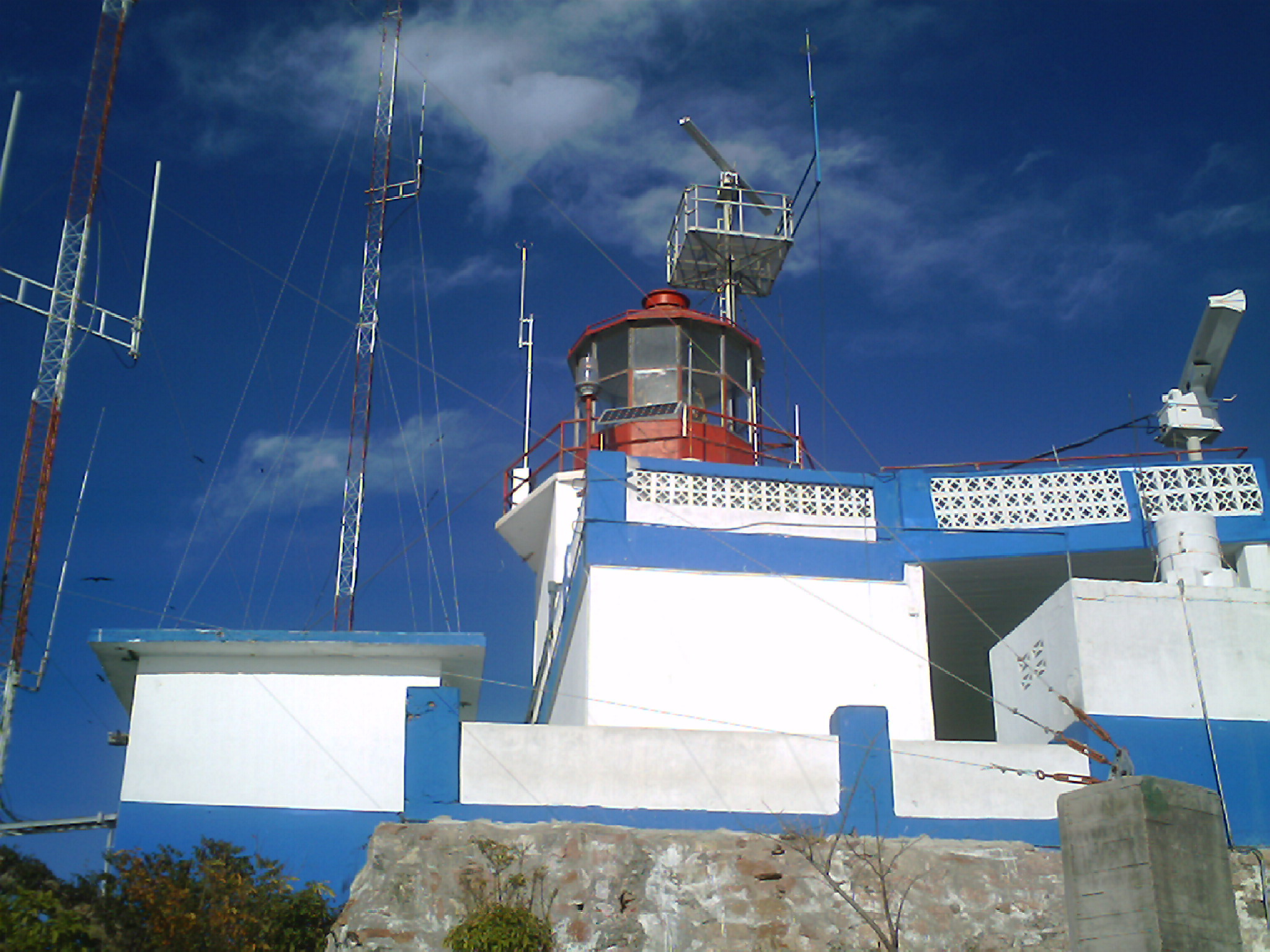
- Close view of the lighthouse
- Location: Mazatlán, Mexico
- Coordinates: 23.177600°N 106.427478°W

Tower
- Constructed: 1892
- Height: 11 m (36 ft)

Light
- Focal height: 157 m (515 ft)
- Lens: second order Fresnel lens
- Range: 33 nmi (61 km; 38 mi)
- Characteristic: Fl W 7s

The Faro Mazatlán is a lighthouse located on top of Crestón Island in Mazatlán. It is one of the most iconic sites in the city and is very visited.

== History ==
In 1879, a gas lamp was placed on top of the hill as a sign of proximity to the port of Mazatlán, This lamp replaced a series of torches. Later the lighthouse used oil and kerosene lamps, which increased its luminosity. In 1892, the engineer José Natividad González built a small quadrangular building that accompanied the lighthouse. A rotating lamp was installed in 1905. In the late 1920s, it operated with a constant level lamp with a three-wick burner. In 1933, an electric lamp replaced the hydrogen one and remained in operation until August 2021, when it was replaced by modern lighting equipment.

== Characteristics ==
The lighthouse measures seven meters high and is considered the highest natural lighthouse in the world, due to its location at the top of the Crestón hill, which reaches 157 meters above sea level. It has marine traffic radars and a thousand-watt lamp that achieves a range of 30 nautical miles or 55 kilometers.

Its status as the highest natural lighthouse in the world has been disputed, since historian Antonio Lerma Garay says that in the Atlantic Ocean there are at least four lighthouses on natural elevations at a higher height than the Mazatlán Lighthouse; The Lovers' Leap in Jamaica with 487 meters, the Chacachacare Lighthouse in Trinidad and Tobago with 251 meters, The Lighthouse of San Vicente Island with 222 meters and El Brigand Hill in Trinidad and Tobago with 221 meters.

== Gallery ==
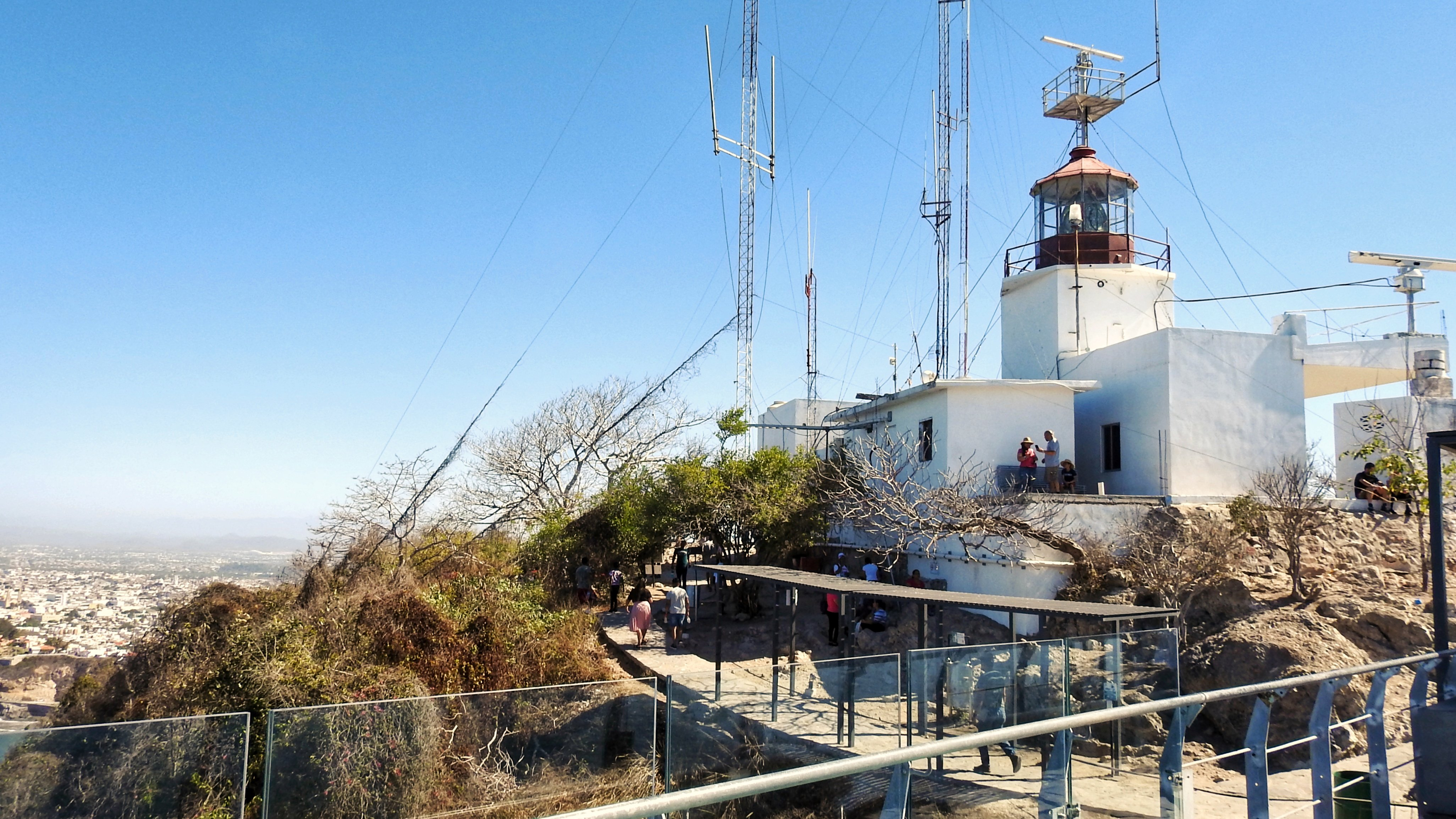
The lighthouse in 2021

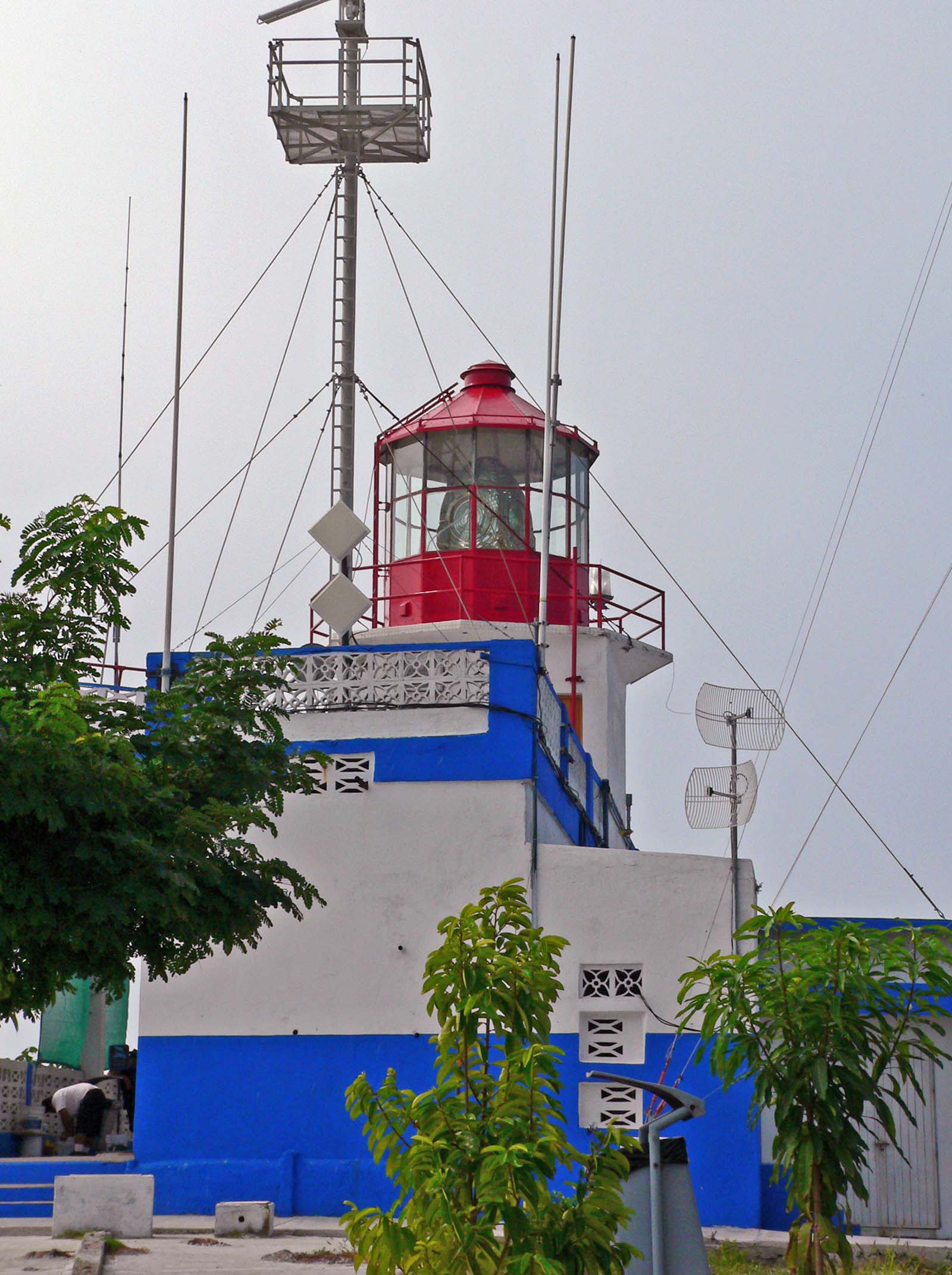
The lighthouse in 2005

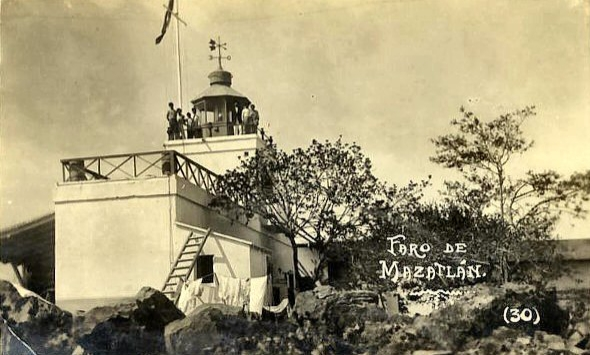
The lighthouse in the 20th century
