= Plazuela Hidalgo, Mazatlán =

Park in Mazatlán

Plazuela Hidalgo
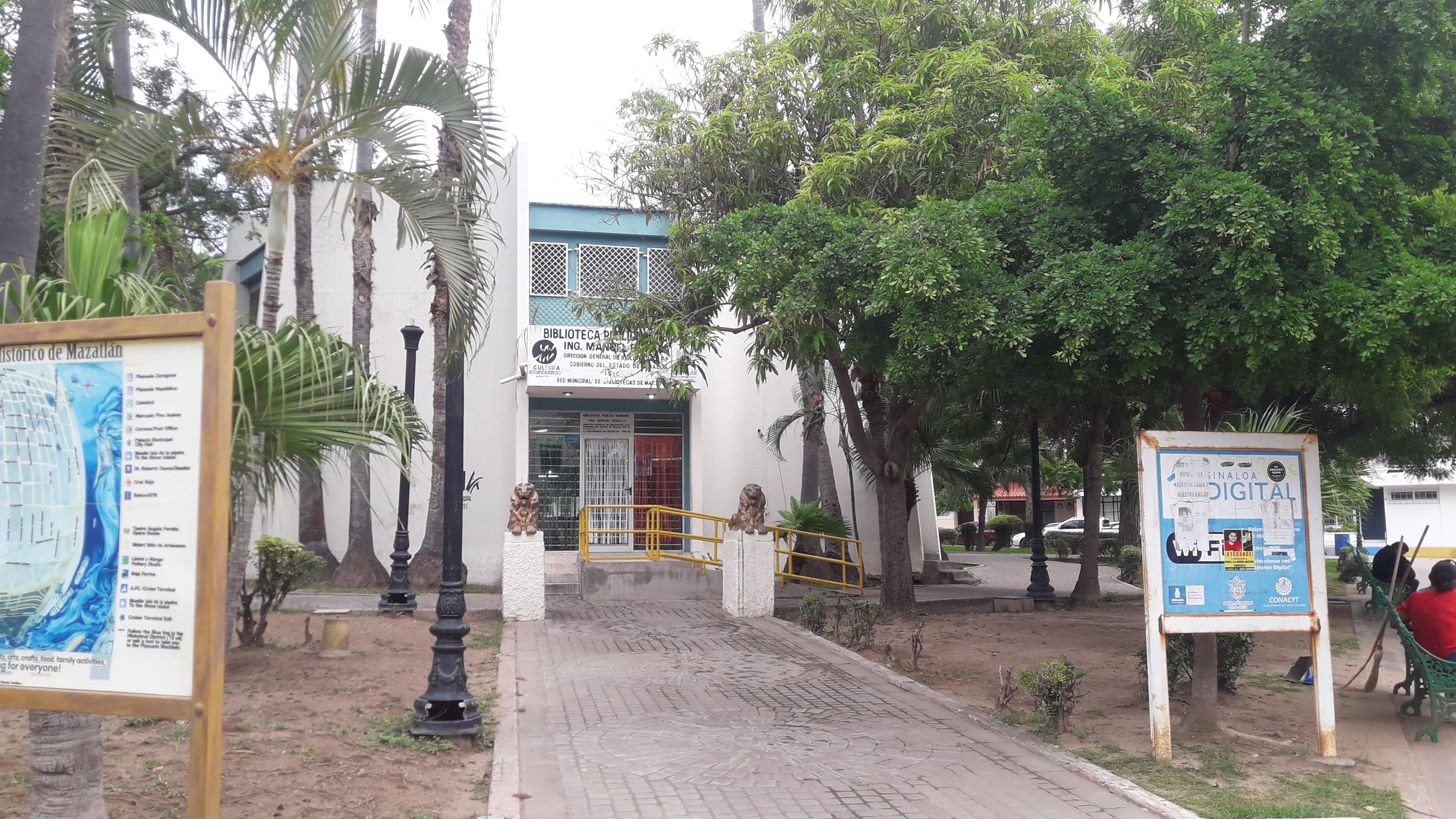
- Plazuela Hidalgo in 2022
- Interactive map of Plazuela Hidalgo
- Type: Public park
- Location: Mazatlán, Mexico
- Coordinates: 23.199834°N 106.425044°W
- Open: Year-round
- Status: Existing
- Website: centrohistoricomazatlan.mx/plazuela-hidalgo-hoy-plazuela-de-los-leones/

The Plazuela Hidalgo or also known as Plazuela de los Leones is a public park in Mazatlán. It is located at the crossroads of the streets Calle Ángel Flores, Calle Compañía, Calle Niños Héroes and Calle Campana. It is one of the oldest parks in the city.

== History ==
Its establishment dates back to 1835. The old port market was originally located in its place. The plaza was owned by Juan Nepomuceno Machado, who was also the owner of Plazuela Machado. In 1855, the French consul in Mazatlán, Philippe Martinet, described the plaza: "In the center of the city is a market whose four sides are occupied by tent-shaped roofs; In the middle there is an open square plaza." In 1865, during the French invasion, the market was changed to what is now Plazuela República. Some time later a statue of Miguel Hidalgo y Costilla would be placed, which was replaced by an art nouveau style kiosk. During the 1920s, lion statues were added. The kiosk was removed in 1970 to build the Manuel Bonilla and Benjamin Franklin libraries that remain to this day. Previously, domestic animals were used to be lent on its property, which is why it was also known as Plaza del Burro.

== Gallery ==
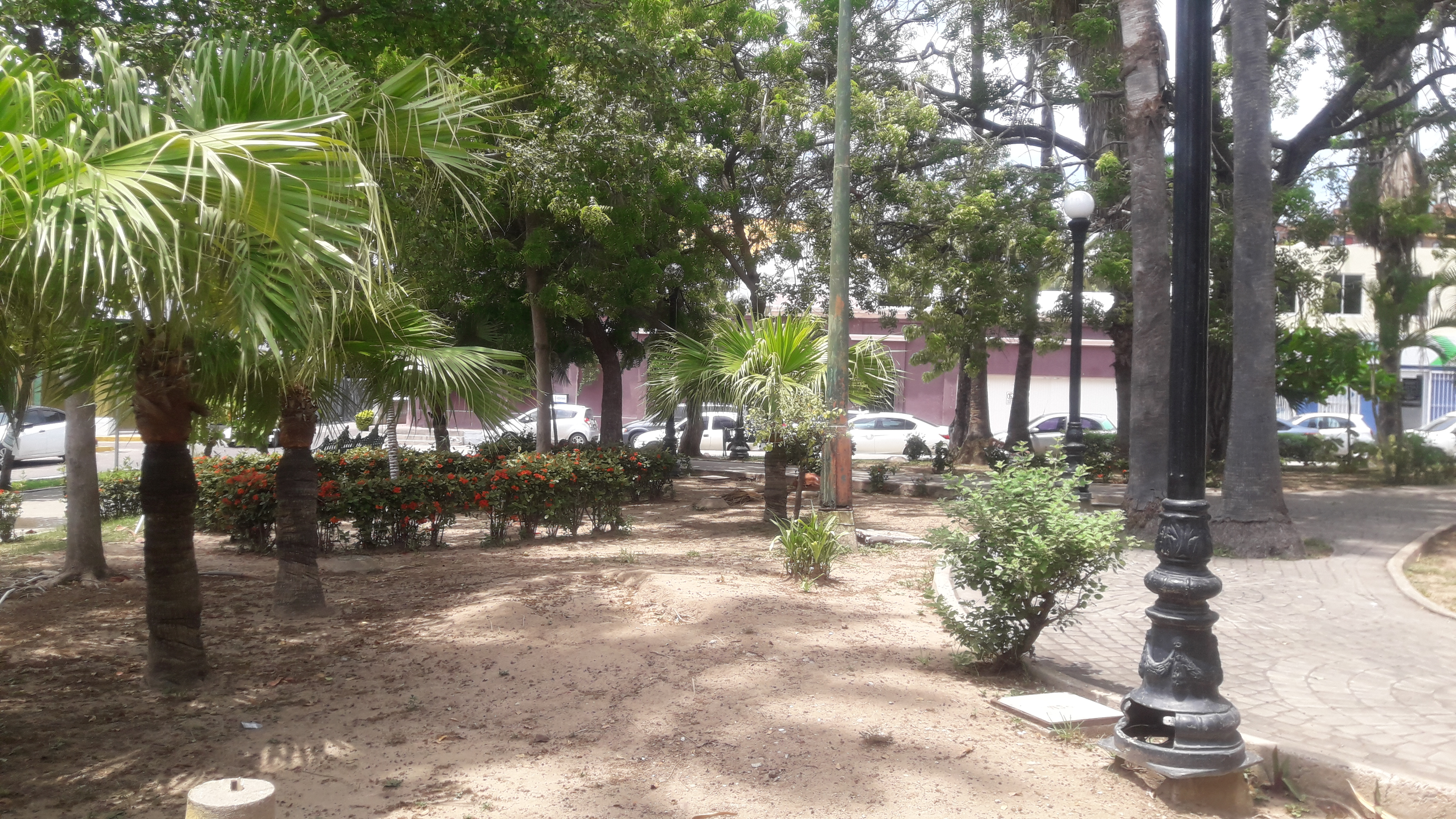
Plazuela Hidalgo in 2023

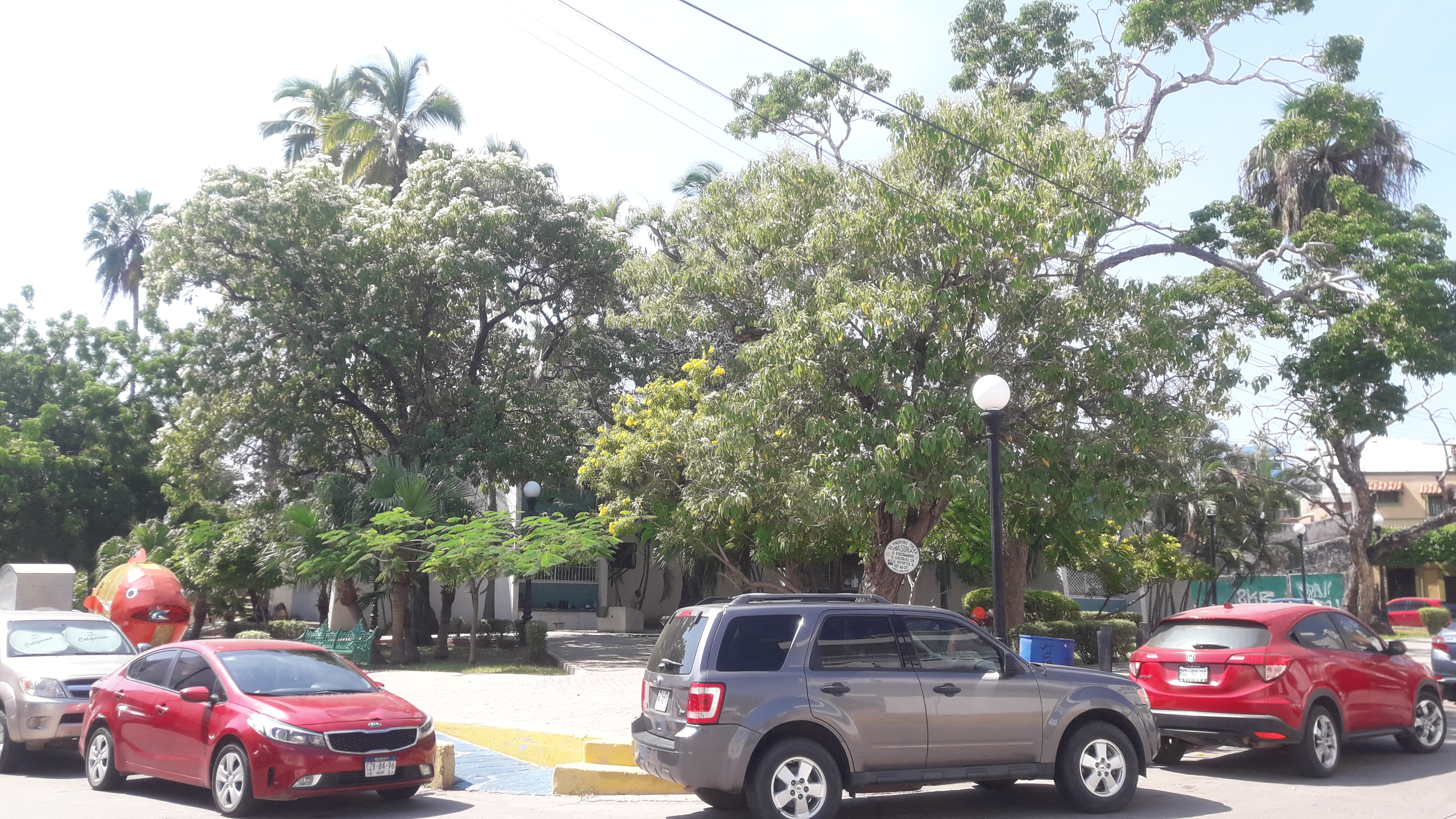
Plazuela Hidalgo from Calle Campana

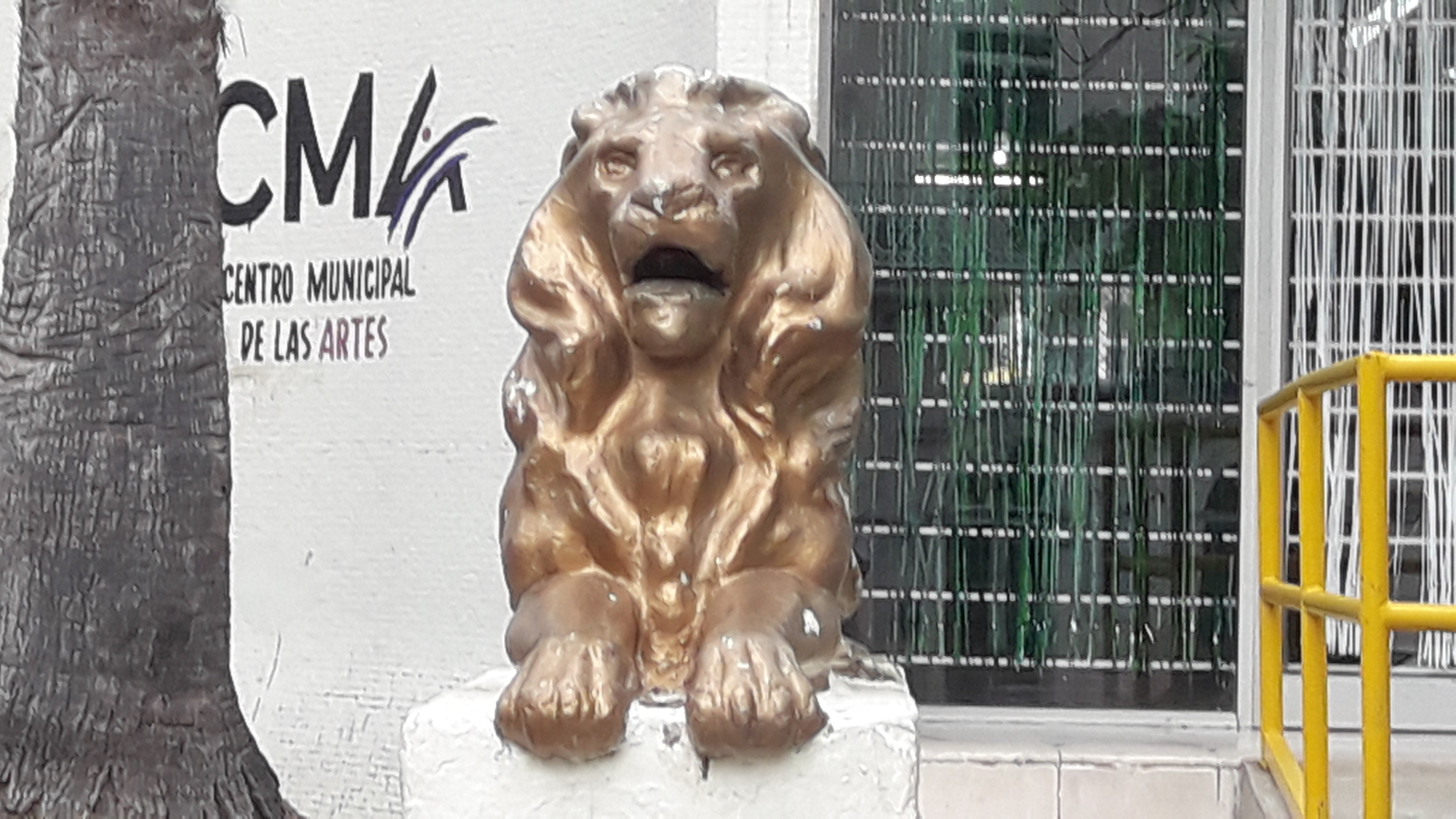
Lion statue

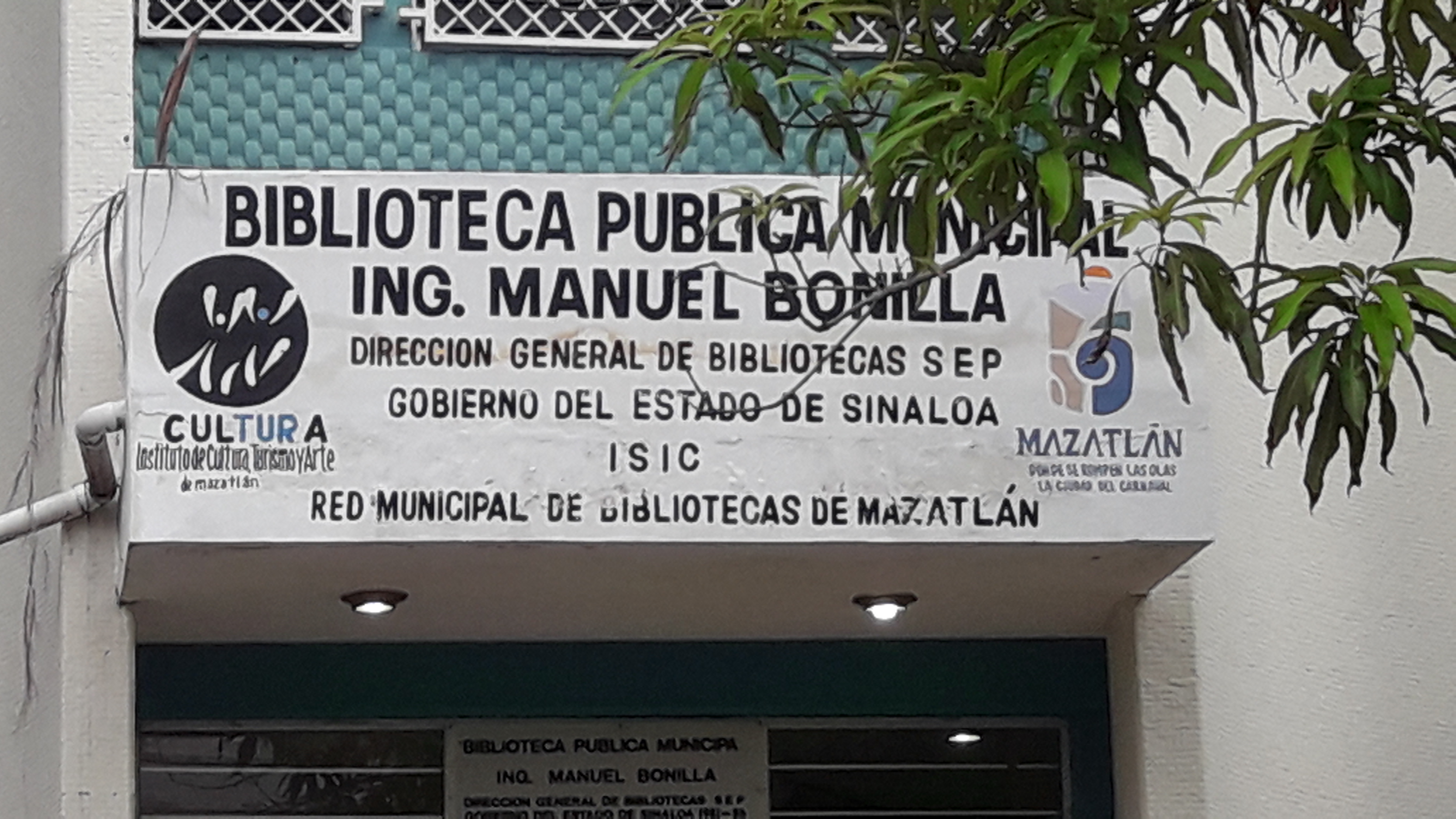
Biblioteca Manuel Bonilla

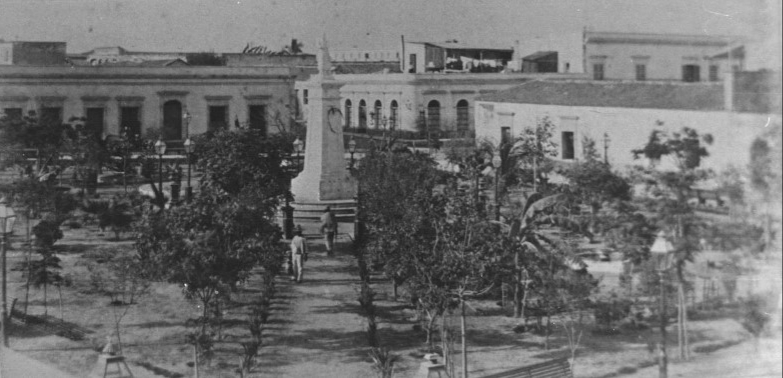
Plazuela Hidalgo in the early 20th century
