= Centro Municipal de las Artes, Mazatlán =

Art school in Mazatlán

Municipal Center of the Arts
- Centro Municipal de las Artes
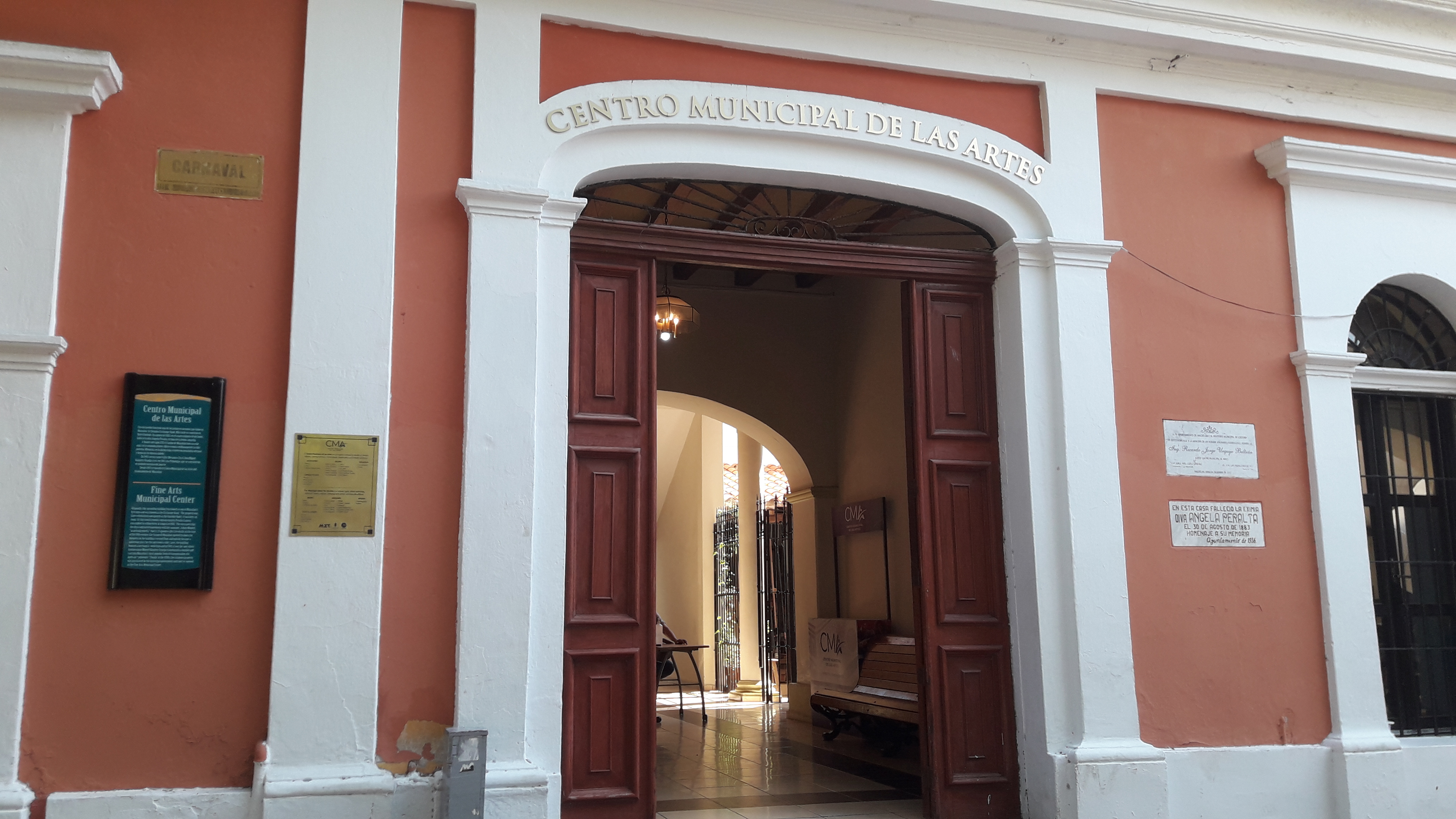
- Entrance of the Municipal Arts Center
- Former names: Hostería Bank (1840-1873); Hotel Iturbide (1873-late 19th century)

General information
- Location: Mazatlán, Mexico
- Address: Calle Carnaval corner with Calle Constitución, Colonia Centro, Mazatlán
- Coordinates: 23.198394°N 106.422483°W
- Inaugurated: November 6, 1989
- Owner: Instituto Municipal de Cultura, Turismo y Arte de Mazatlán

Website
- culturamazatlan.com/es/centro-municipal-de-artes/

The Centro Municipal de las Artes (Municipal Center of the Arts) is an art school in the city of Mazatlán. It is located next to the Ángela Peralta Theater and in front of Plazuela Machado, this being a place frequented by local artists and musicians.

== History ==
The building previously functioned as the Iturbide Hotel, built in its first stage in 1840 in which it served as the 'Bank' Inn. The businessman Don Manuel Rubio acquired the place and formally established the hotel and its second floor was added in 1873. The soprano singer Ángela Peralta died in this hotel on August 30, 1883. It is considered one of the hotels that boosted tourism in the city, because it offered its guests a pleasant view of the Plazuela Machado and proximity to the Rubio Theater.

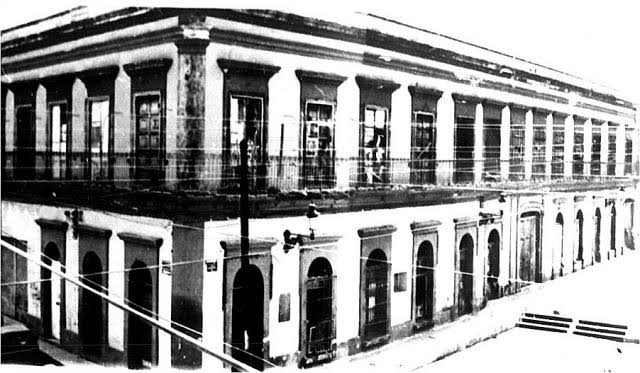
The original hotel

Its use as a hotel would begin to decline over time. For 10 years it served as a mechanical workshop and during this time it was where Miguel Ramírez Urquijo designed the iconic vehicles called 'pulmonias' that took to the streets on December 20, 1965.

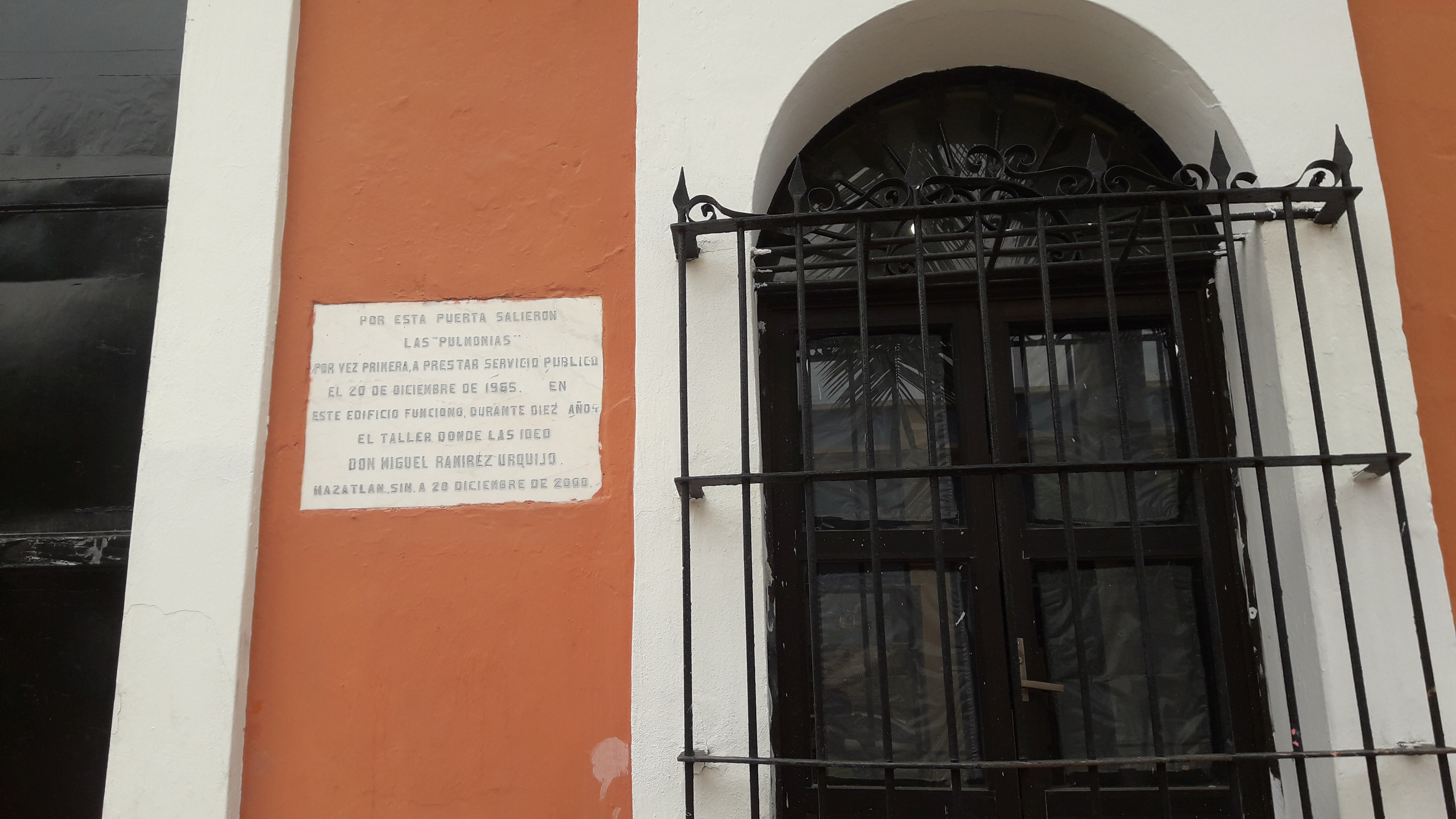
The hotel later became a mechanical workshop

The Municipal Arts Center opened its doors on November 6, 1989. It was a response from the municipal government to the need to attend to the artistic training of local young people. Currently there are workshops on folkloric ballet, plastic arts, theater, cinema and literature. Three bachelor's degrees are taught at the Municipal Arts Center: Bachelor's Degree in Singing, Bachelor's Degree in Music and Bachelor's Degree in Contemporary Dance.

== Gallery ==
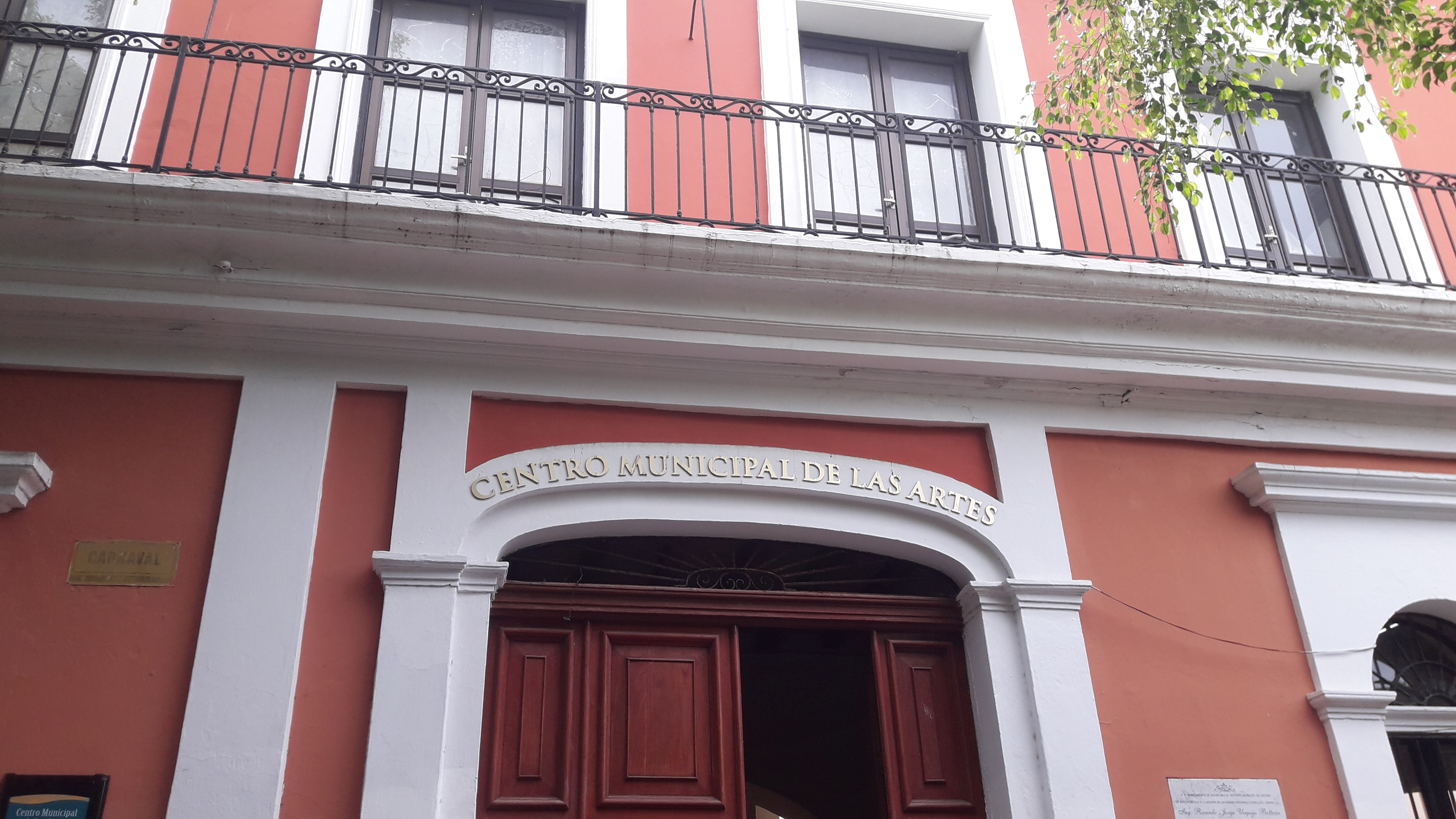
Main building

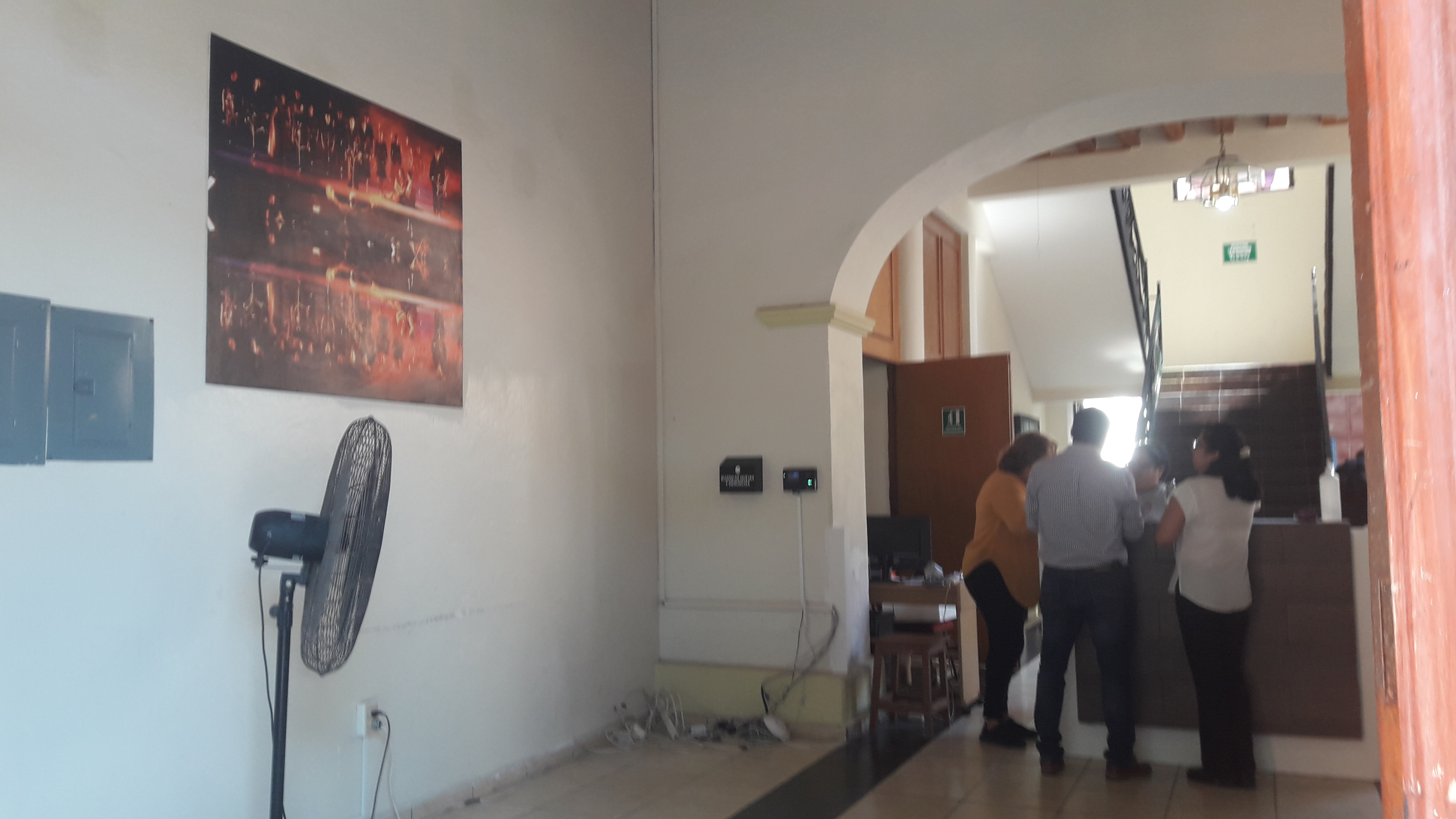
Interior of the reception

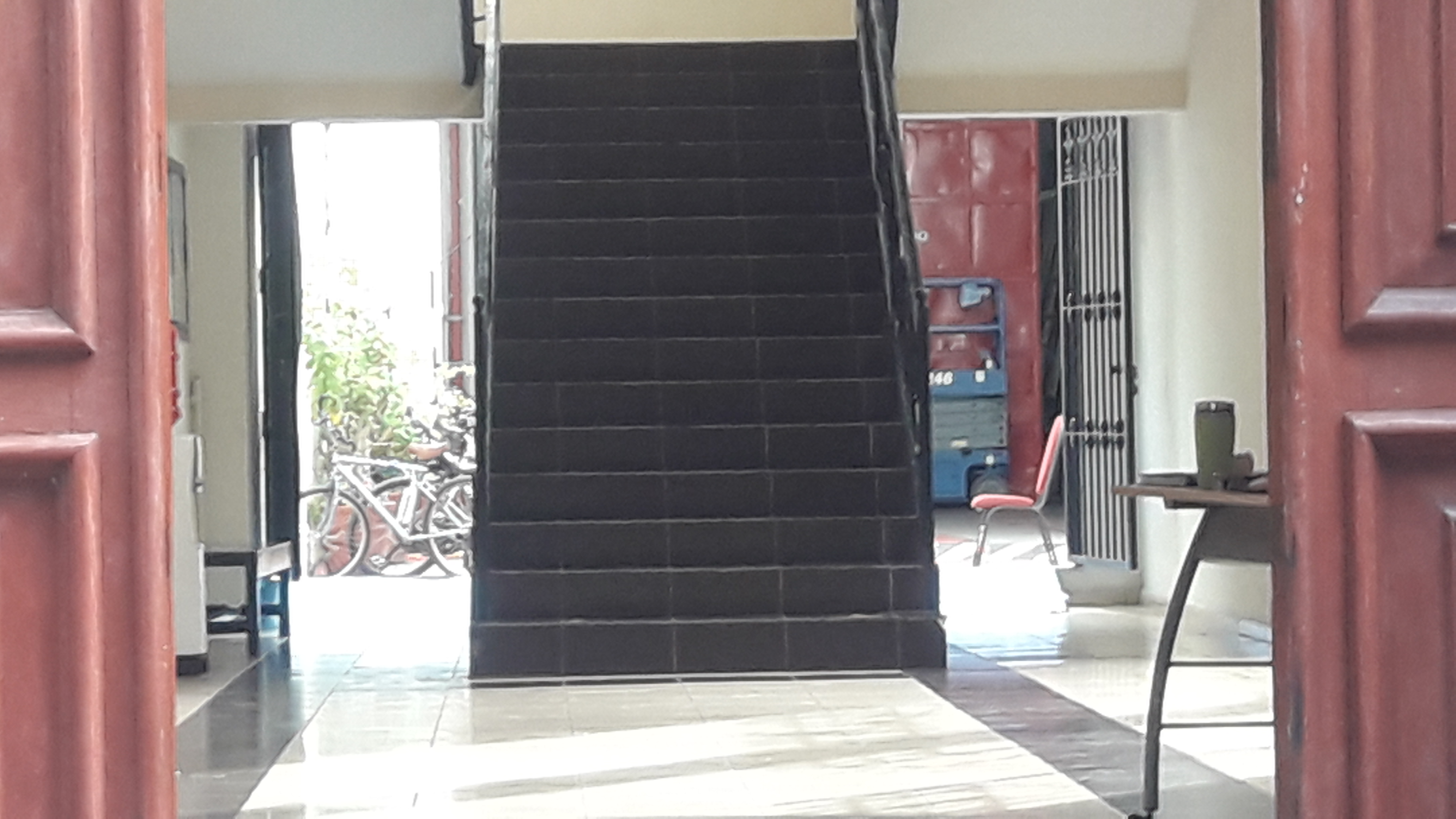
Stairs in the interior

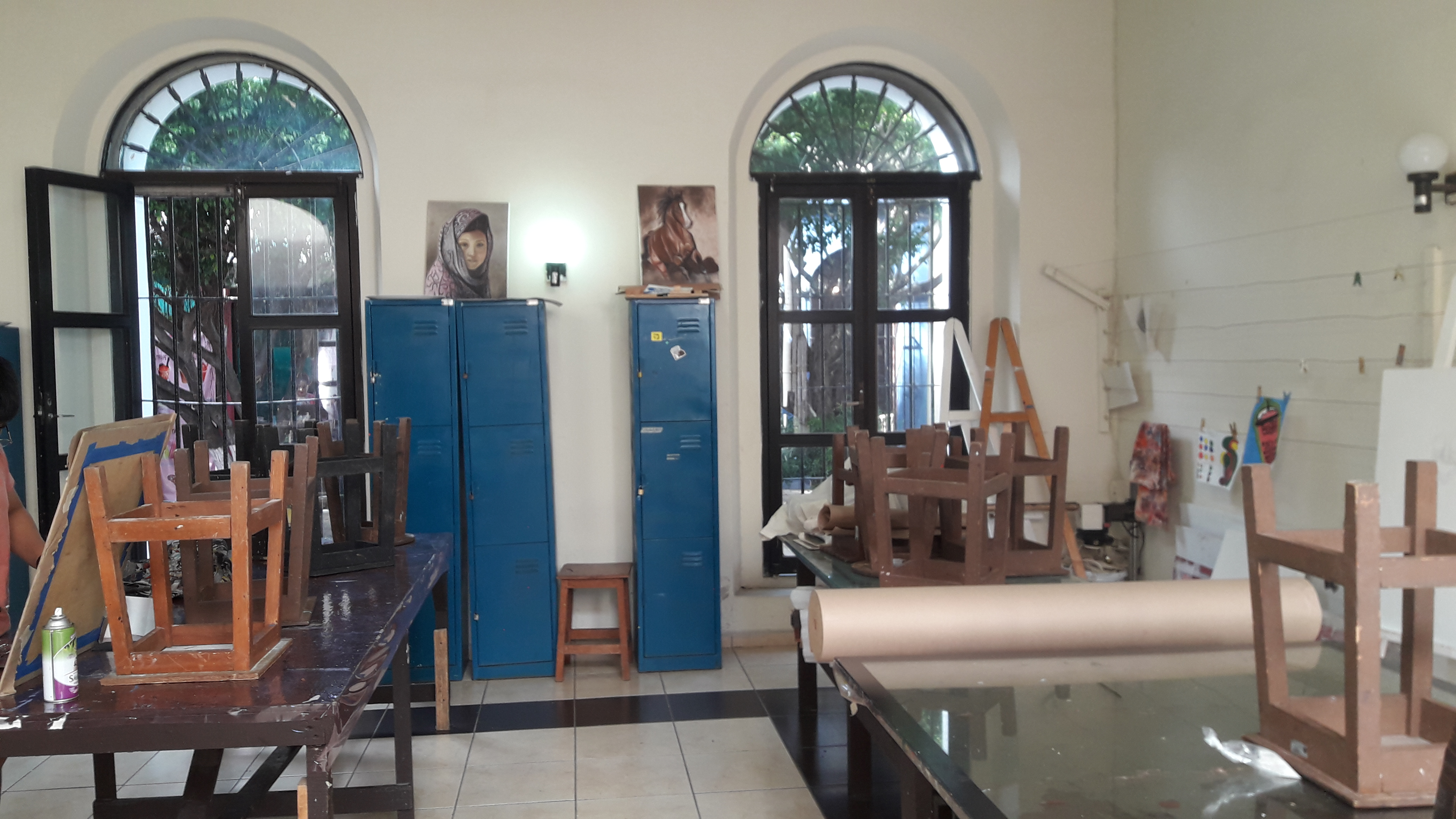
Plastic arts workshop

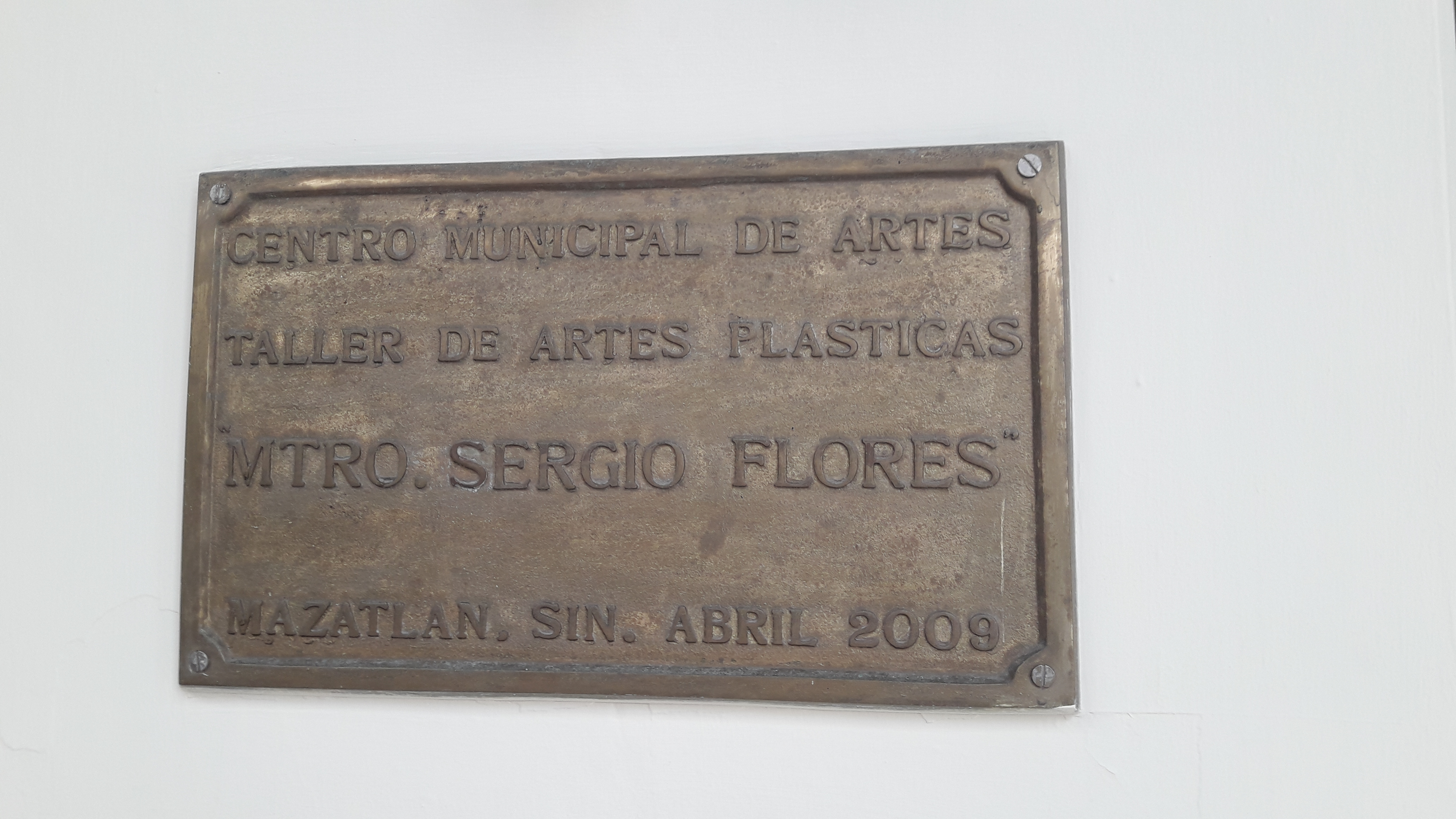
Plaque of the plastic arts workshop
