= Plazuela Machado =

Public park in Mazatlán

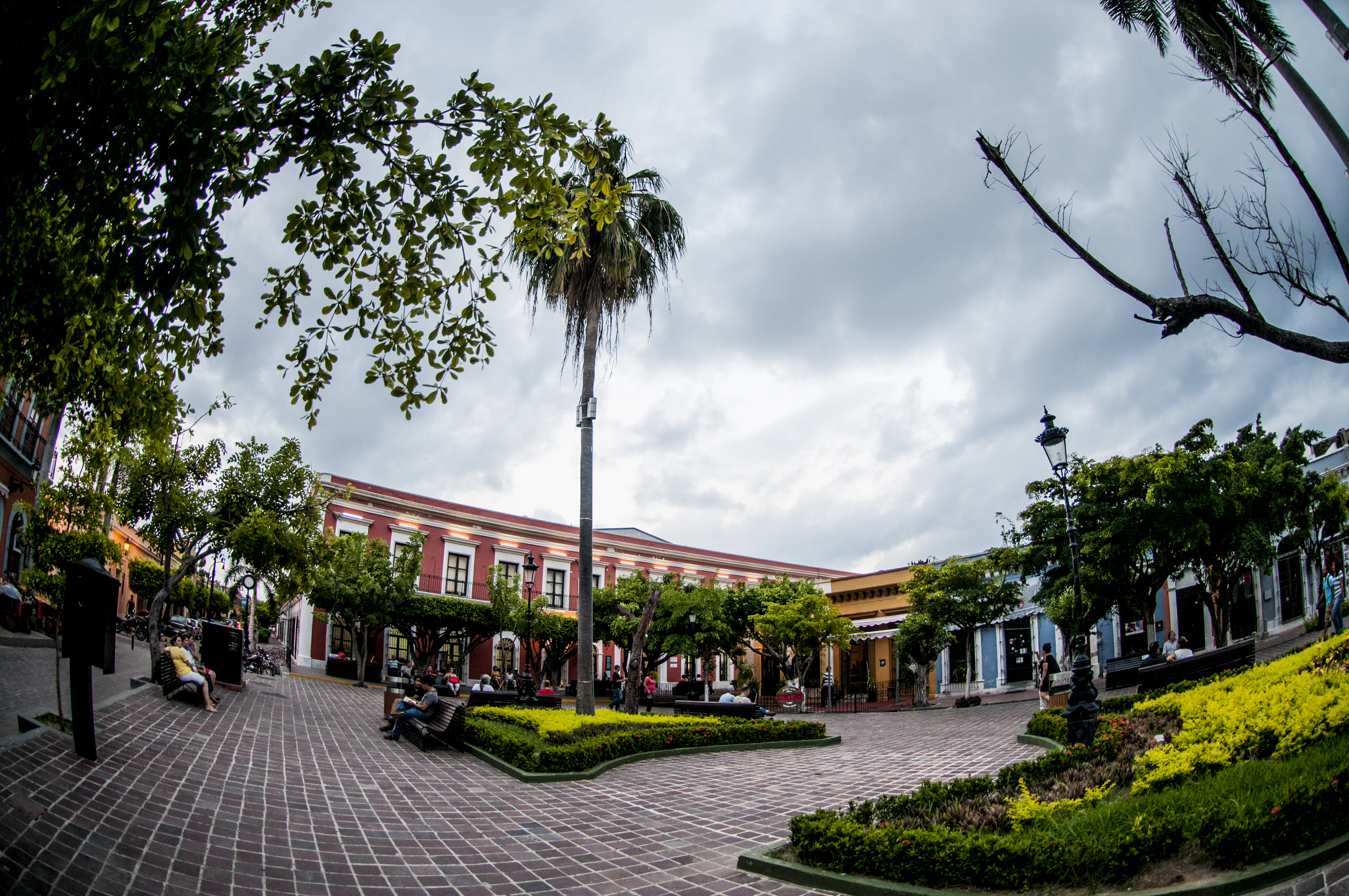
- Plazuela Machado
- Interactive map of Plazuela Machado
- Type: Public park
- Location: Mazatlán, Mexico
- Coordinates: 23.19836°N 106.42318°W
- Open: Year-round
- Status: Existing
- Website: www.mexicoescultura.com/recinto/66296/plazuela-machado-sinaloa.html

The Plazuela Machado is a public park in the historic centre of Mazatlán, Mexico. It is one of the oldest parks in the city. The plaza is the first urban space that was designed as a recreational area in Mazatlán.

== History ==
It was built in 1837 by Juan Nepomuceno Machado, a merchant of fabrics, silver and pearls. He would later donate the land to the city under the condition that it be used to establish a public plaza. On July 12, 1852, Francisco de la Vega, then governor of Sinaloa, marched to the limits of the city with 250 soldiers, two cannons and weapons and prepared to take command of Mazatlán, but it was too much hatred what this governor had provoked among the Mazatlecos who, despite only having 60 men, the citizens joined the battle that took place on the land that is currently Plazuela Machado and its surroundings. Originally it had an esplanade with 36 stone benches and leafy orange trees, which is why it received the name "El Paseo de los Naranjos". In 1881 it was remodeled and a central kiosk was added that remains to this day. At that time, the largest commercial buildings and residences of prosperous foreign merchants were built around it.

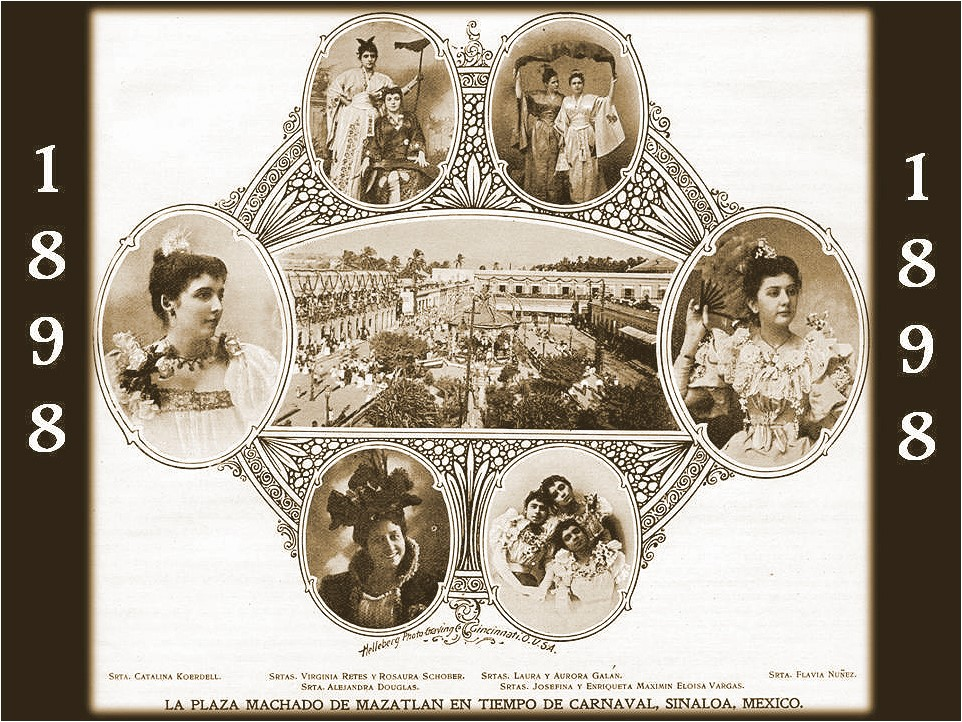
The carnival in 1898

Plazuela Machado is one of the carnival venues, since every year a gastronomic exhibition and various festivities are held. The place offers a rich cultural experience as visitors can buy local crafts at commercial stalls. In addition, its proximity to the Ángela Peralta Theater makes it a park very frequented by both tourists and locals. In this square Amado Nervo walked during his days in the city and met two musicians Enrique Navarro and Eligio Mora. Nervo mentioned Plazuela Machado in his local chronicles. On June 1, 2018, a bust was unveiled in honor of the poet Amado Nervo. It is located at the intersection of Carnaval and Constitución streets, looking in the direction of the square. Painting exhibitions, book fairs and all kinds of cultural, artistic and political events are held quite regularly.

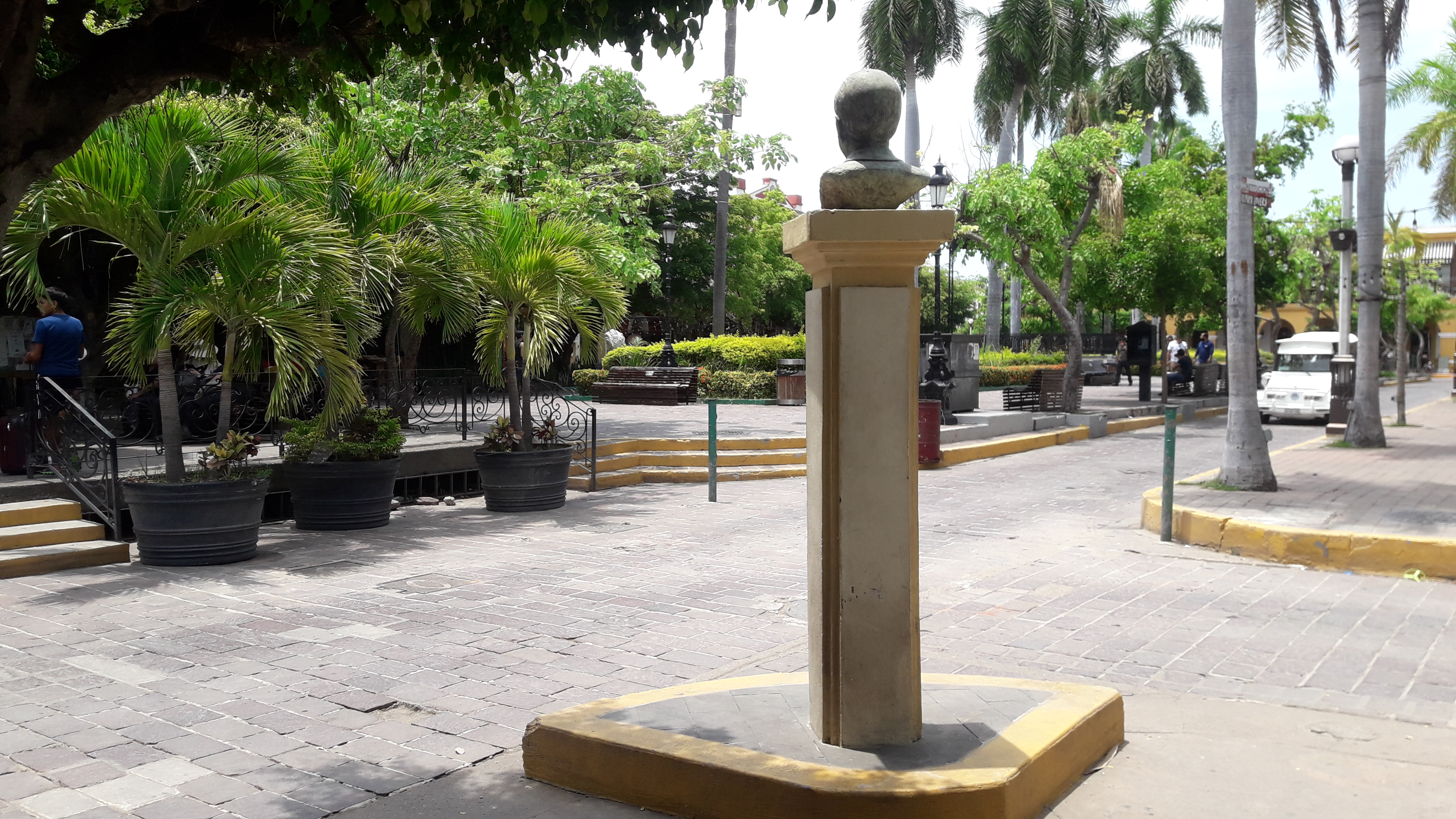
Back view of the Amado Nervo bust

== Gallery ==
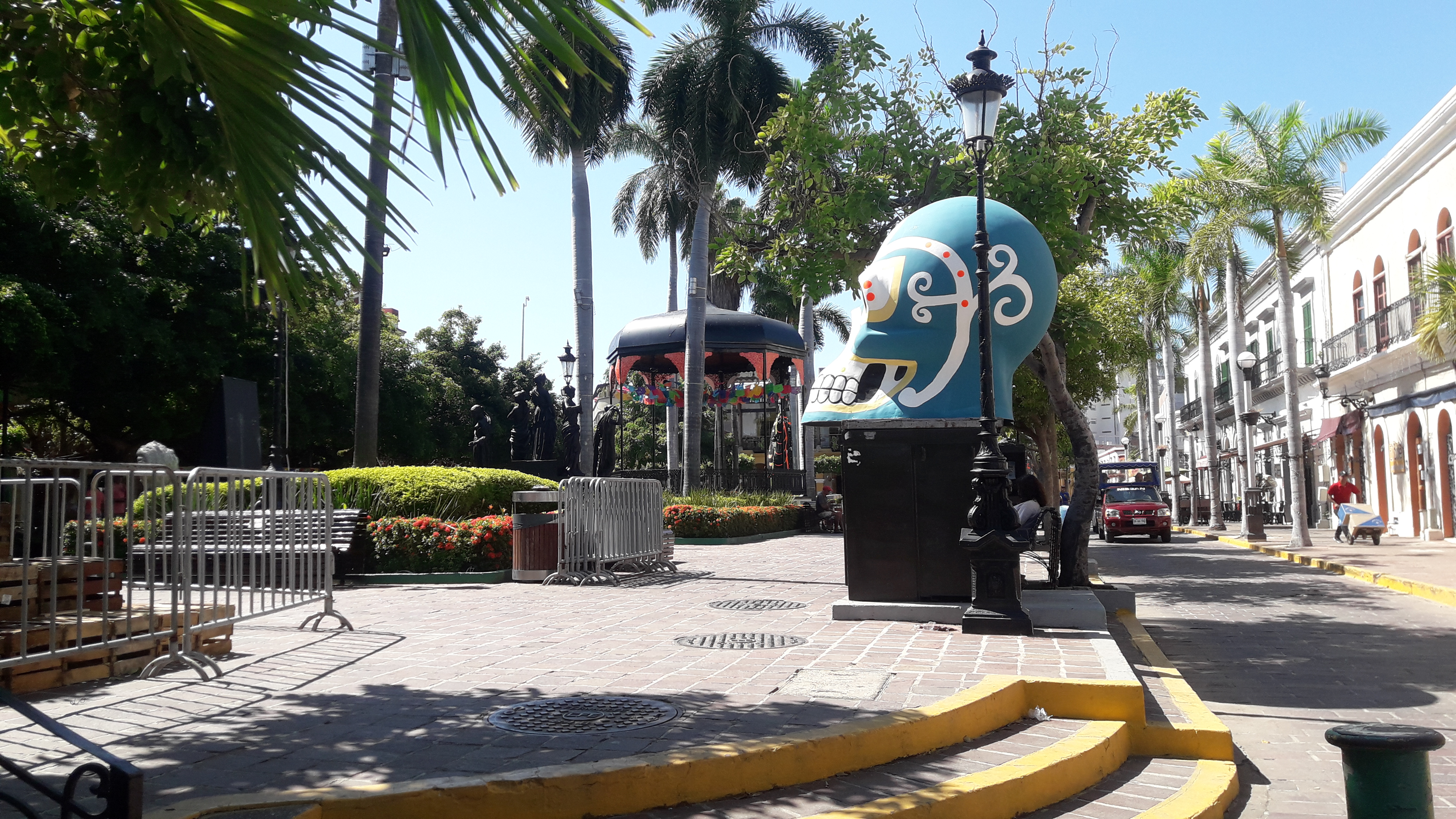
Plazuela Machado in 2022

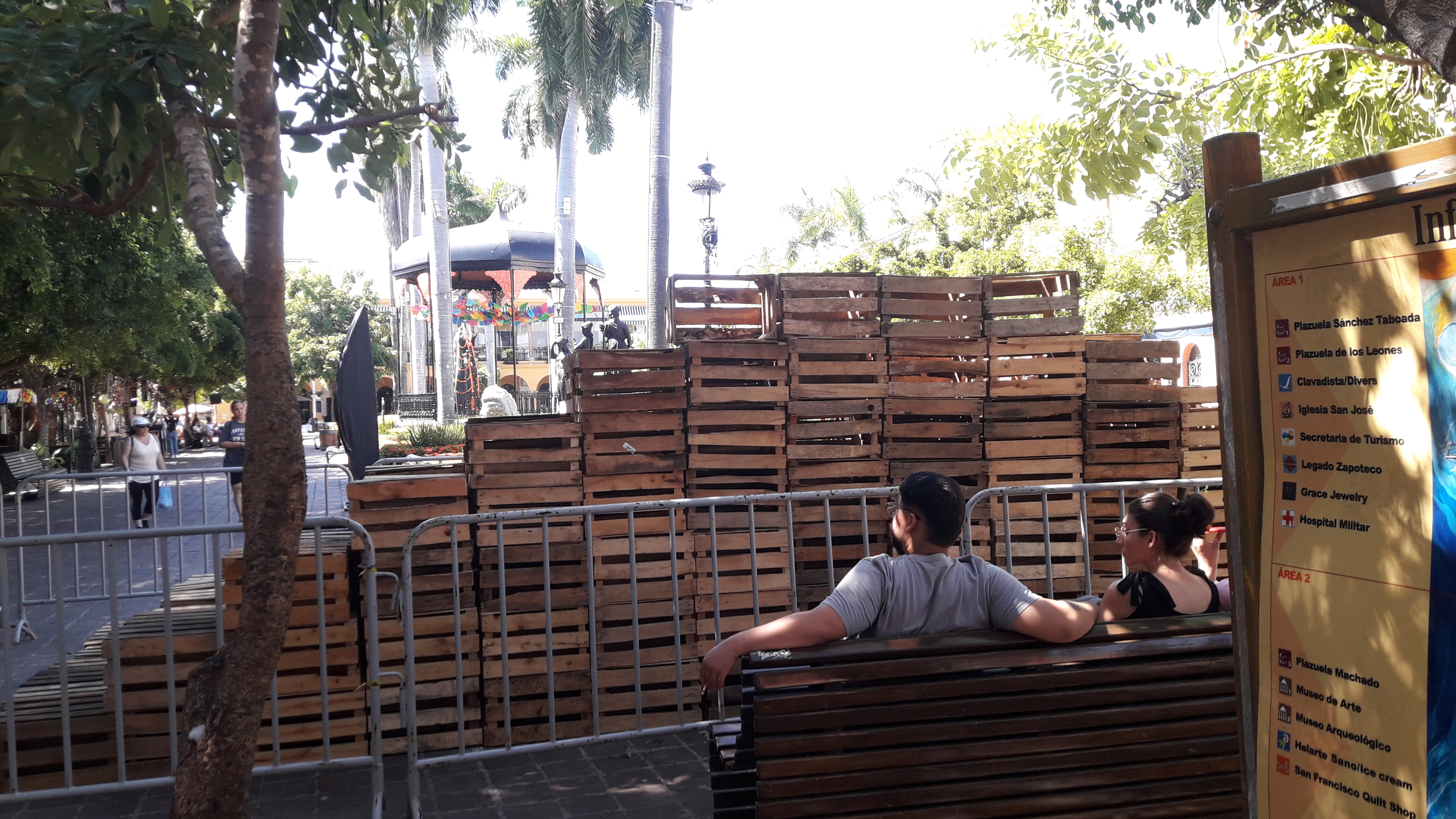
Preparations for the Day of the Dead in the Plazuela

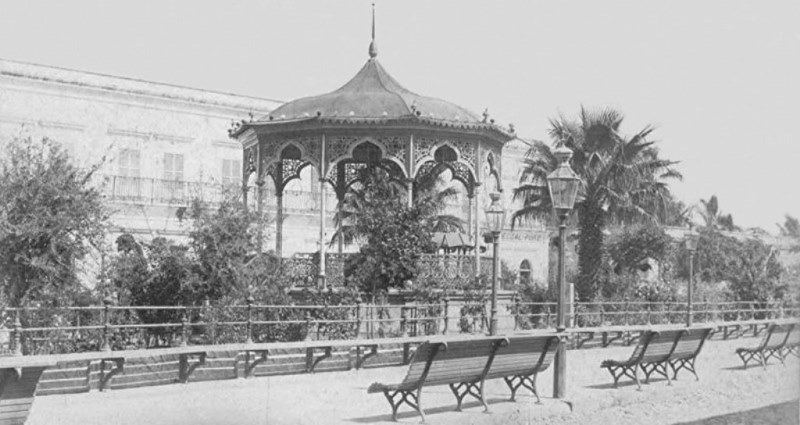
Plazuela Machado in the 20th century

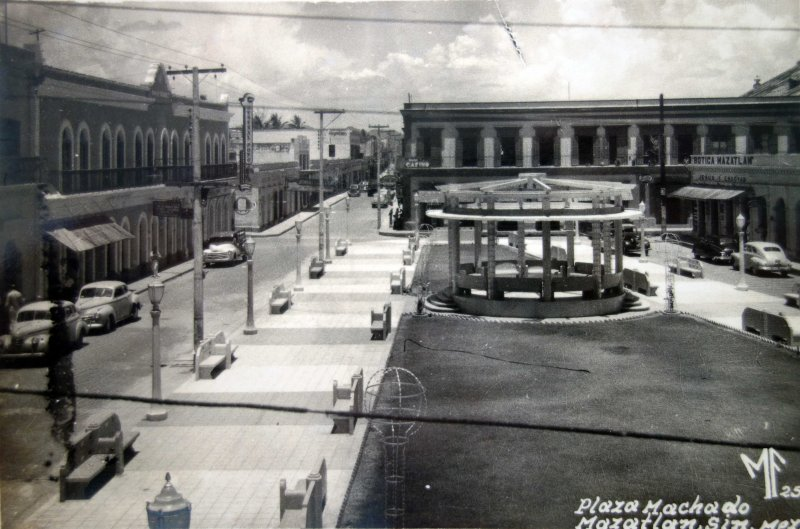
Plazuela Machado in 1953

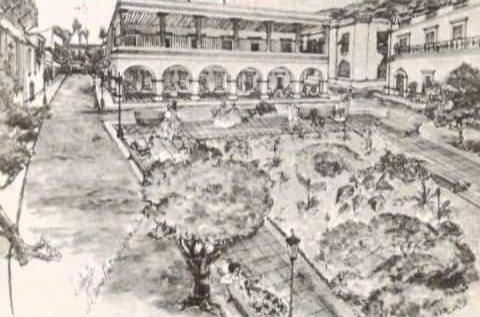
Old drawing of the Plazuela
