= Teatro Ángela Peralta, Mazatlán =

Theater in Mazatlán

Ángela Peralta Theater
- Teatro Ángela Peralta
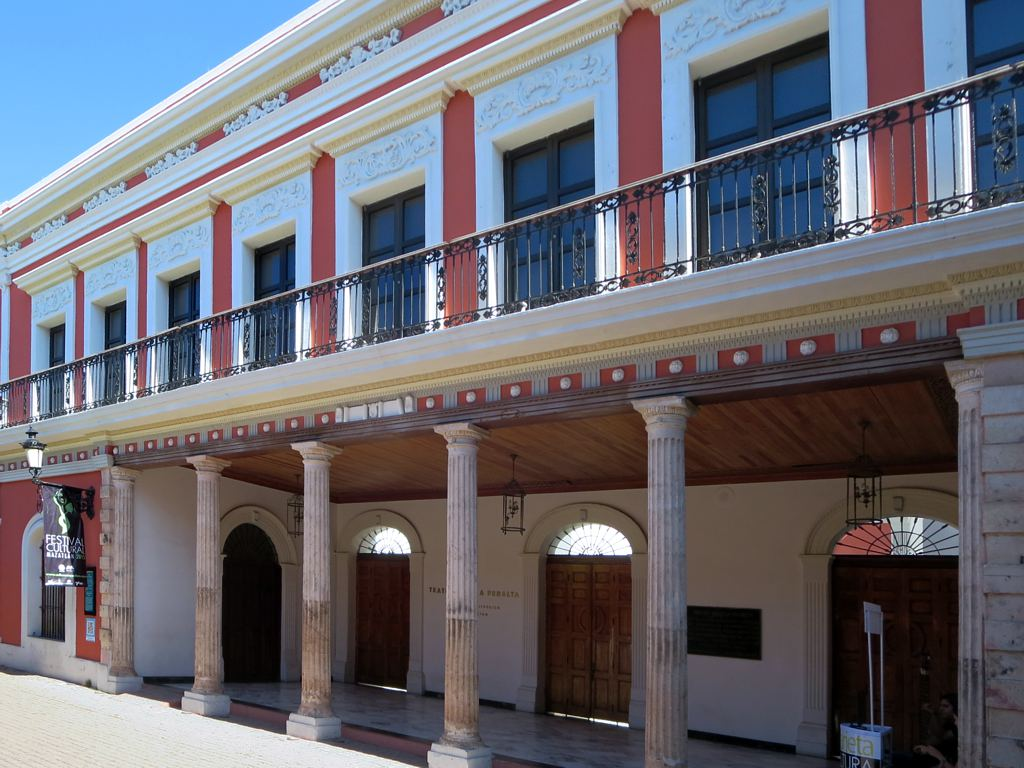
- Ángela Peralta Theater
- Interactive map of the Ángela Peralta Theater area
- Former names: Teatro Rubio (1874-1943); Cine Ángela Peralta (1943-1964)

General information
- Location: Mazatlán, Mexico, Calle Carnaval, Colonia Centro, Mazatlán
- Coordinates: 23.198022°N 106.422319°W
- Named for: Ángela Peralta
- Years built: 1869-1874; 1987-1992
- Groundbreaking: 1869
- Inaugurated: February 15, 1874 (first time, as Teatro Rubio); August 30, 1883 (second time, first time officially); October 23, 1992 (third time, second restoration)
- Renovated: 1879-1881

Design and construction
- Architects: Juan José León Loya (second restoration); Santiago León Astengo (1879 renovation)
- Engineer: Andrés Librado Tapia

Website
- culturamazatlan.com/es/teatro-angela-peralta/

The Teatro Ángela Peralta (Ángela Peralta Theater) is a theater building in the city of Mazatlán, Sinaloa. It was erected in the Porfirian era of the port and is considered one of the most beautiful and important buildings of its type in Mexico. It was declared a National Historical Heritage in 1990.

== History ==
The original design of the building was carried out by the engineer Andrés Librado Tapia and its construction took place between 1869 and 1874.

It was inaugurated on February 15, 1874, with the name Teatro Rubio, property of businessman Manuel Rubio. At that time this theater was a modest popular hall. Between 1879 and 1881, several major renovations and repairs were carried out. Once it was completely finished, it was officially inaugurated on February 6, 1881. The singer Ángela Peralta died on August 30, 1883, in the adjacent Iturbide hotel (today the Municipal Center of the Arts). There is no evidence that the soprano ever sang before audiences at the theater that now bears her name, but it can be argued that she rehearsed.

In 1943, during the years of World War II, the Rubio Theater became the Ángela Peralta Cinema and was closed years later in 1964, although it continued to be used as a workshop for the Carnival Queen's floats. In the 1969 carnival it was opened for the last time to offer a burlesque show.

In 1975, Hurricane Olivia lifted the wooden roof of the theater and crashed inside it, breaking its cast iron balconies and leaving the forum's woodwork in pieces. In 1987, after more than 10 years of deterioration and oblivion, the architect Juan José León Loya carried out the restoration of the building. Once the second restoration of the theater was completed, it was inaugurated for the third time on October 23, 1992.

On December 19, 1990, by presidential decree, the theater was declared Historical Heritage of the Nation. Today it is home to artistic and cultural events of national and international stature.

== Gallery ==
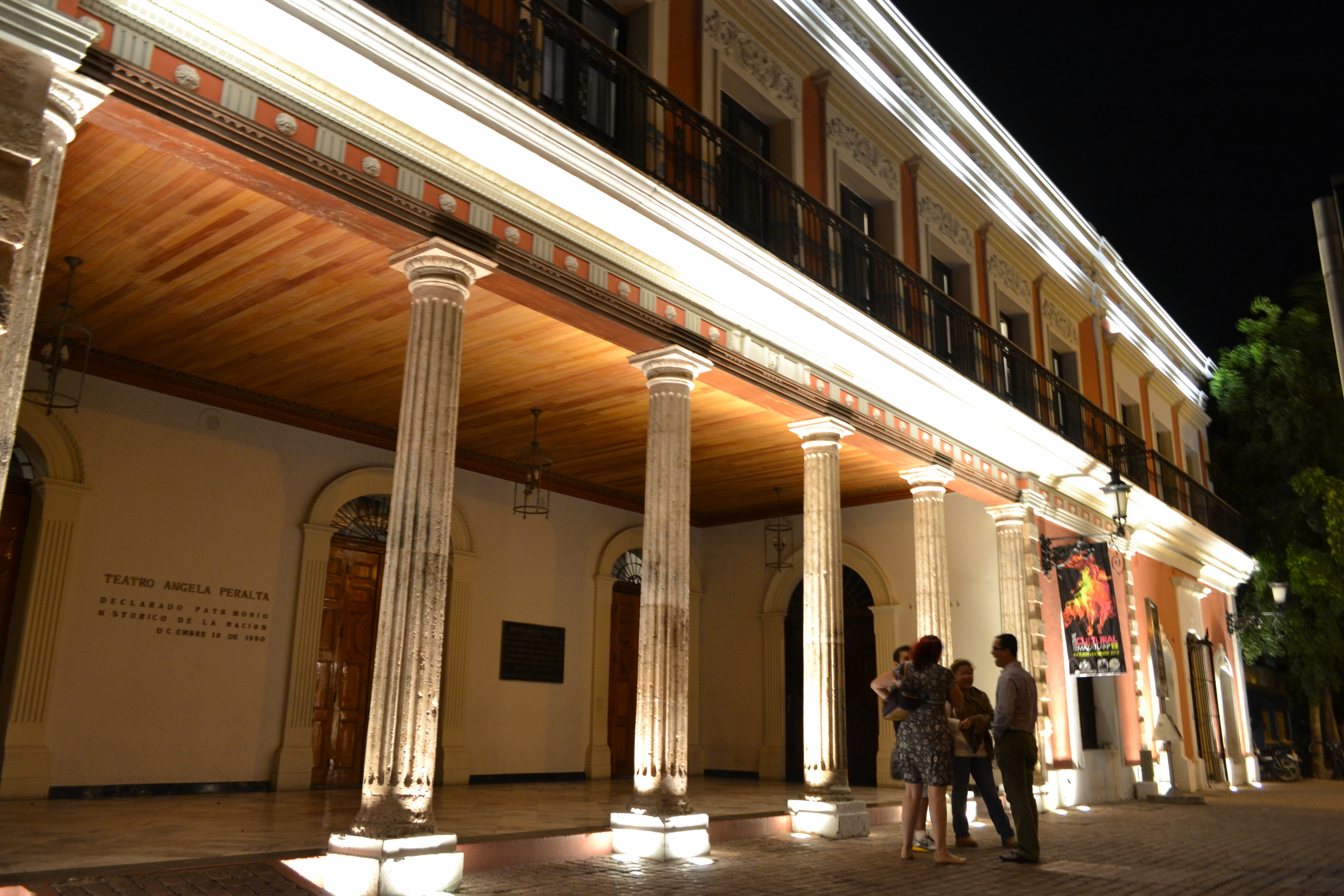
Exterior of the building

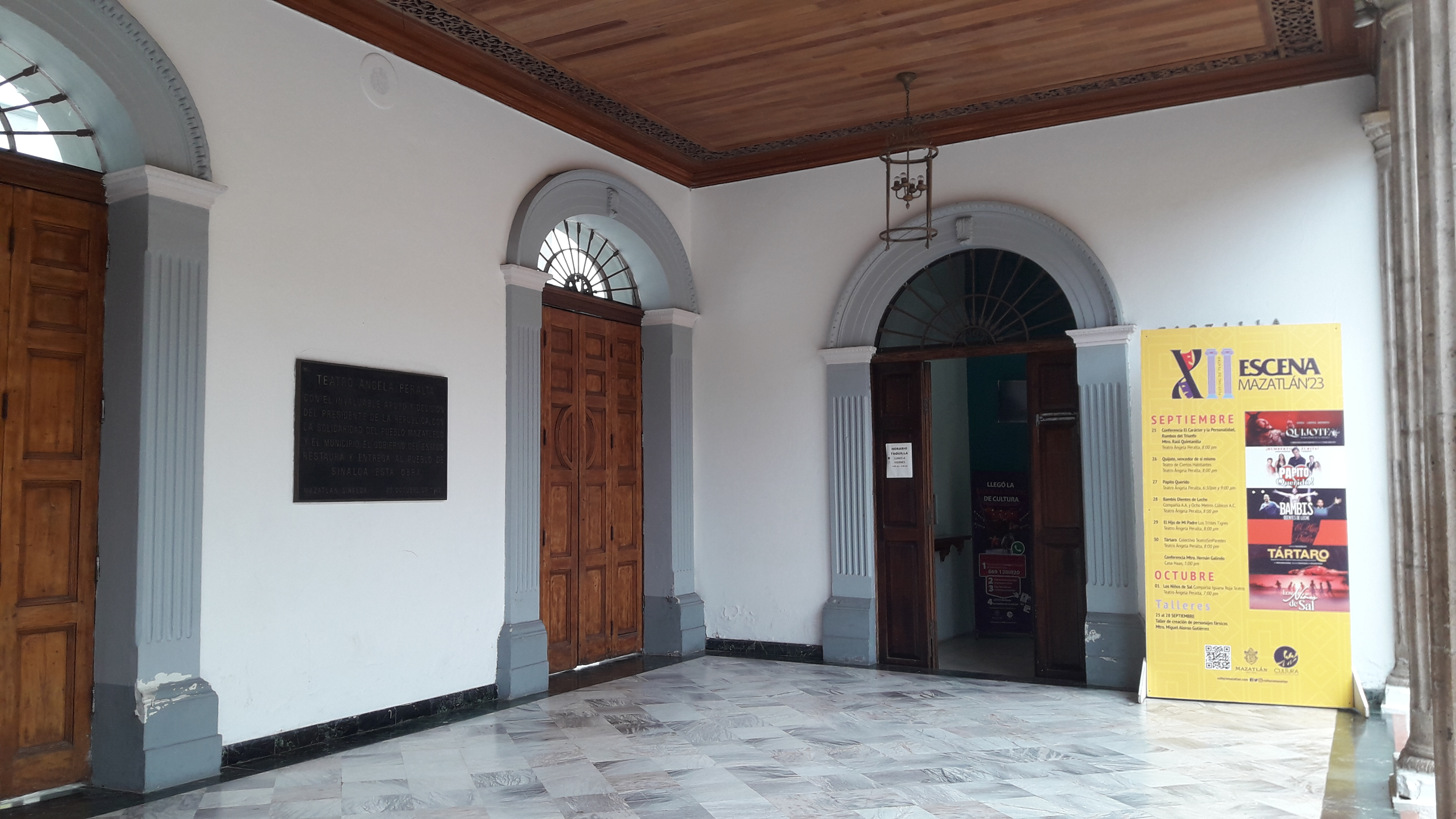
Access to the ticket office

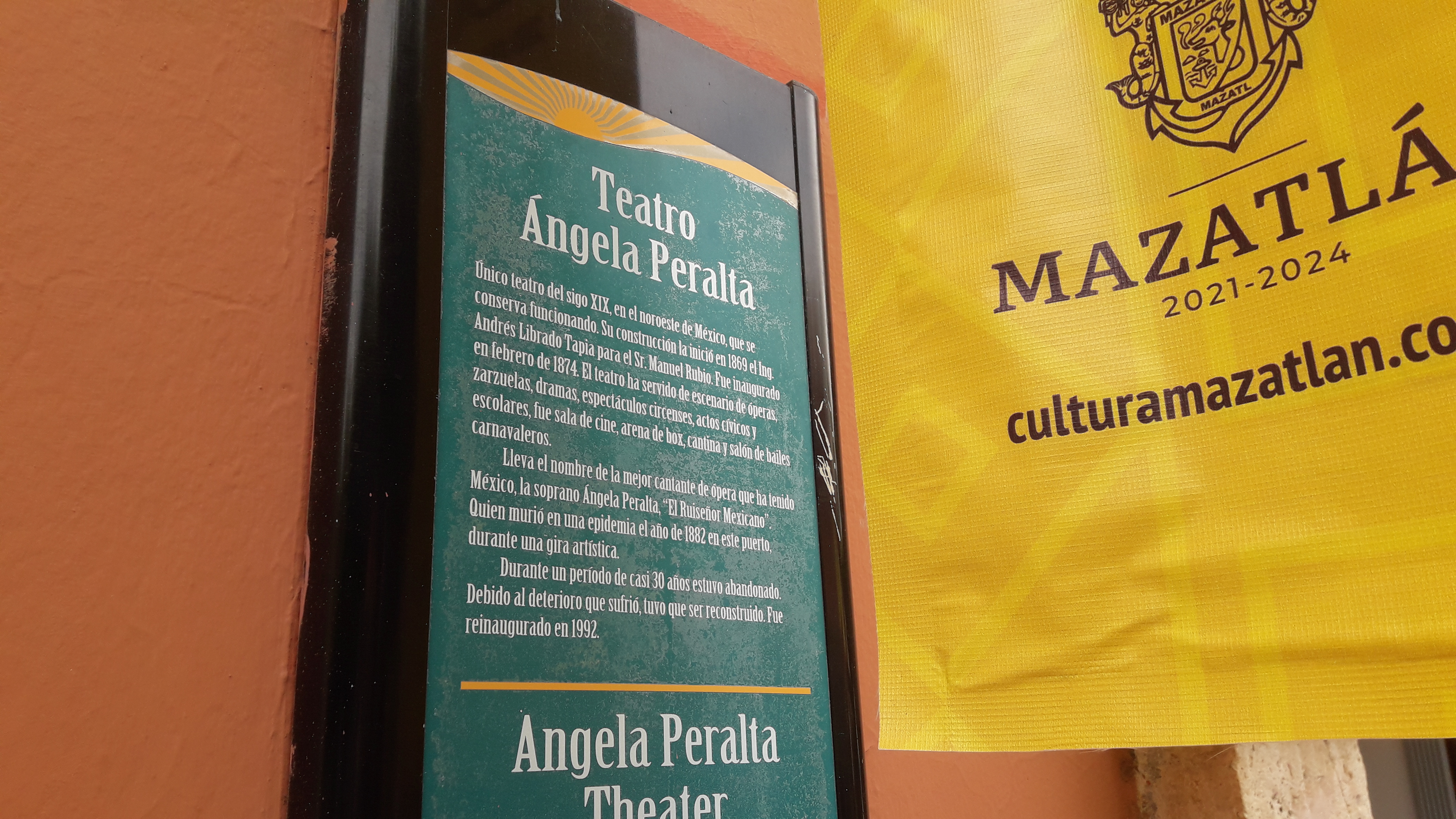
Information sign

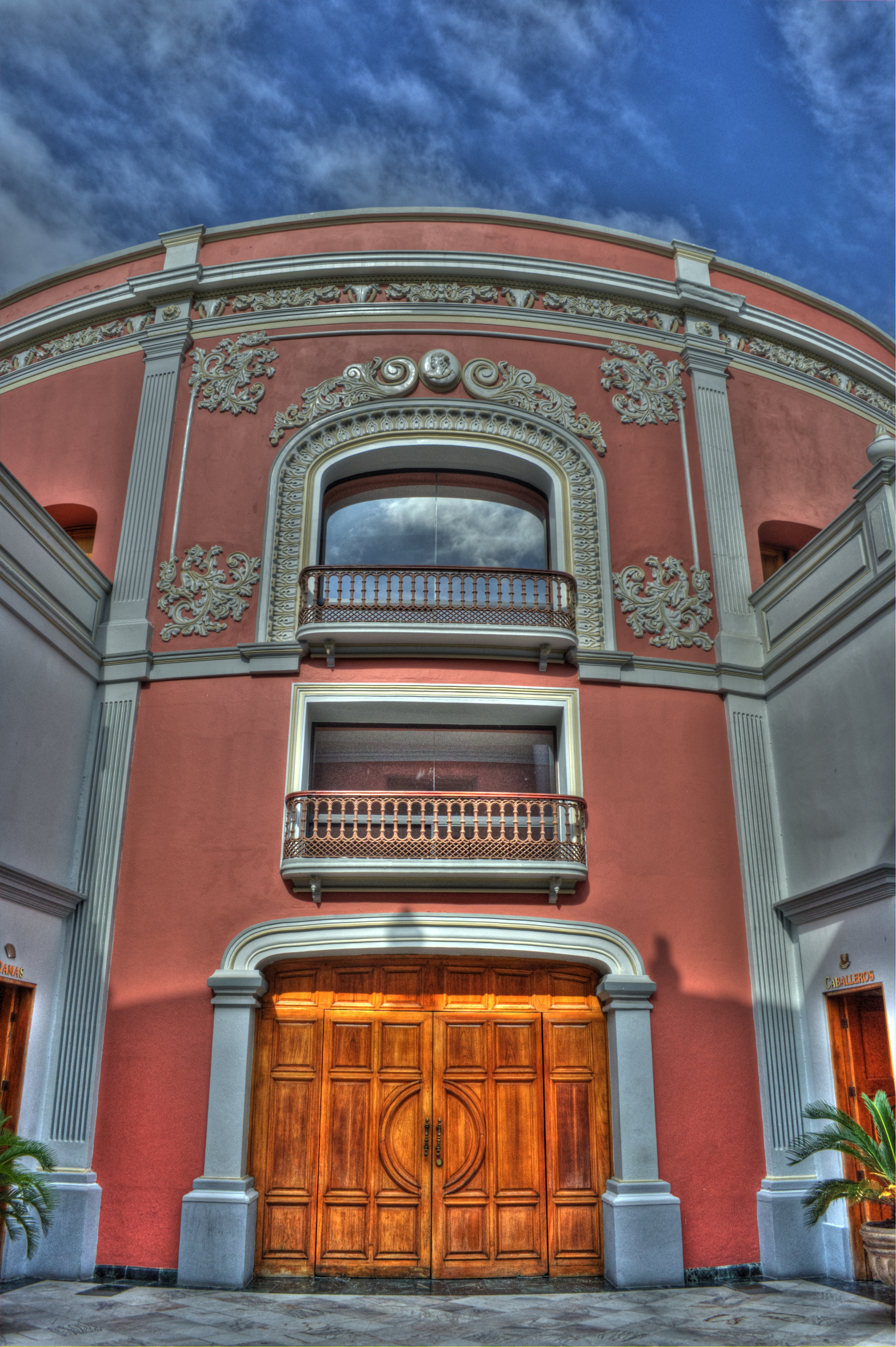
Central facade

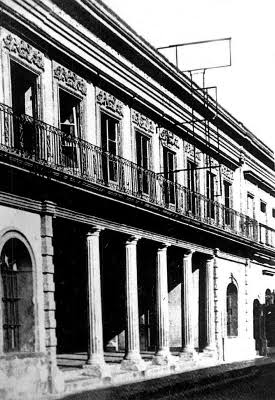
The theater at the beginning of the 20th Century

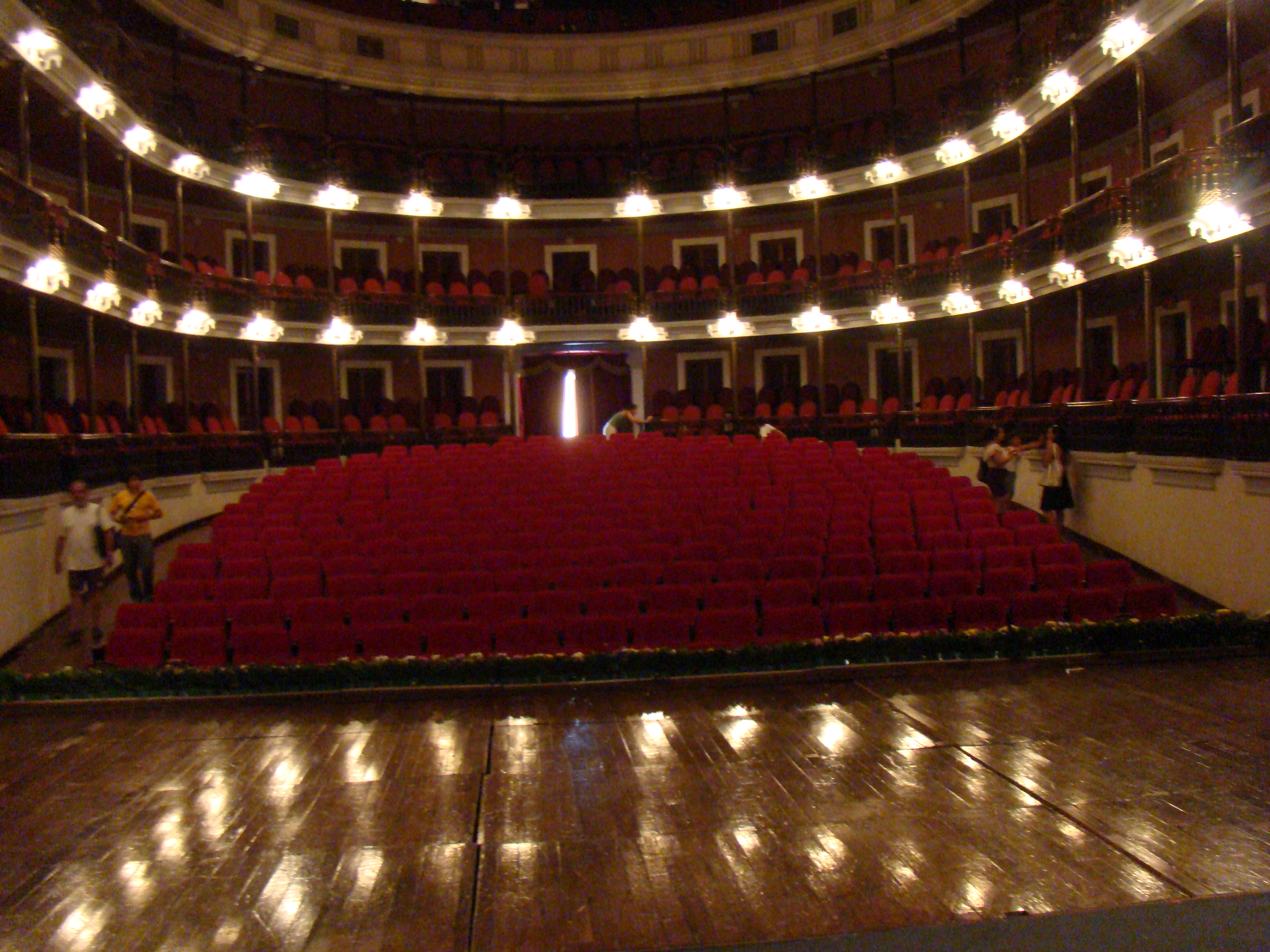
Theater interior
