= Juan Nepomuceno Machado =

Book of the life of Juan Nepomuceno Machado, there are no known photos of this individual.

Juan Nepomuceno Machado is considered to be the father of the Mexican community of Mazatlan. He was a merchant from the Philippines who traded in fabric, pearls and silver. He settled on the coast of Sinaloa in 1829 where there were fishing villages and established a business financing pearl divers. He expanded into financing the reopening of mines in two towns Concordia, Sinaloa and San Jose de Copala in the Sierra Madre which had begun over a hundred years before. He left much of his fortune to help build the churches and municipal parks and buildings in the town of Mazatlan. Machado Square, which sits on land donated by Machado, was founded around 1837, according to historical records.

Prior to his arrival in Mexico around 1825, Machado had been working for people previously employed by Spain's Royal Philippine Company, which fell apart between 1810 and 1820. Machado traveled between Calcutta, Canton, Macao and Mexico for his employer Yrisarri and Company, and on his own account. While in Asia, Machado was involved in the opium trade, though he no doubt also traded in more mundane articles.

== See also ==
- Mazatlan

== Sources ==
- Mazatlan: Plazuela de Machado
