= El Quelite, Sinaloa =

Town in the Mexican state of Sinaloa

El Quelite
- Town
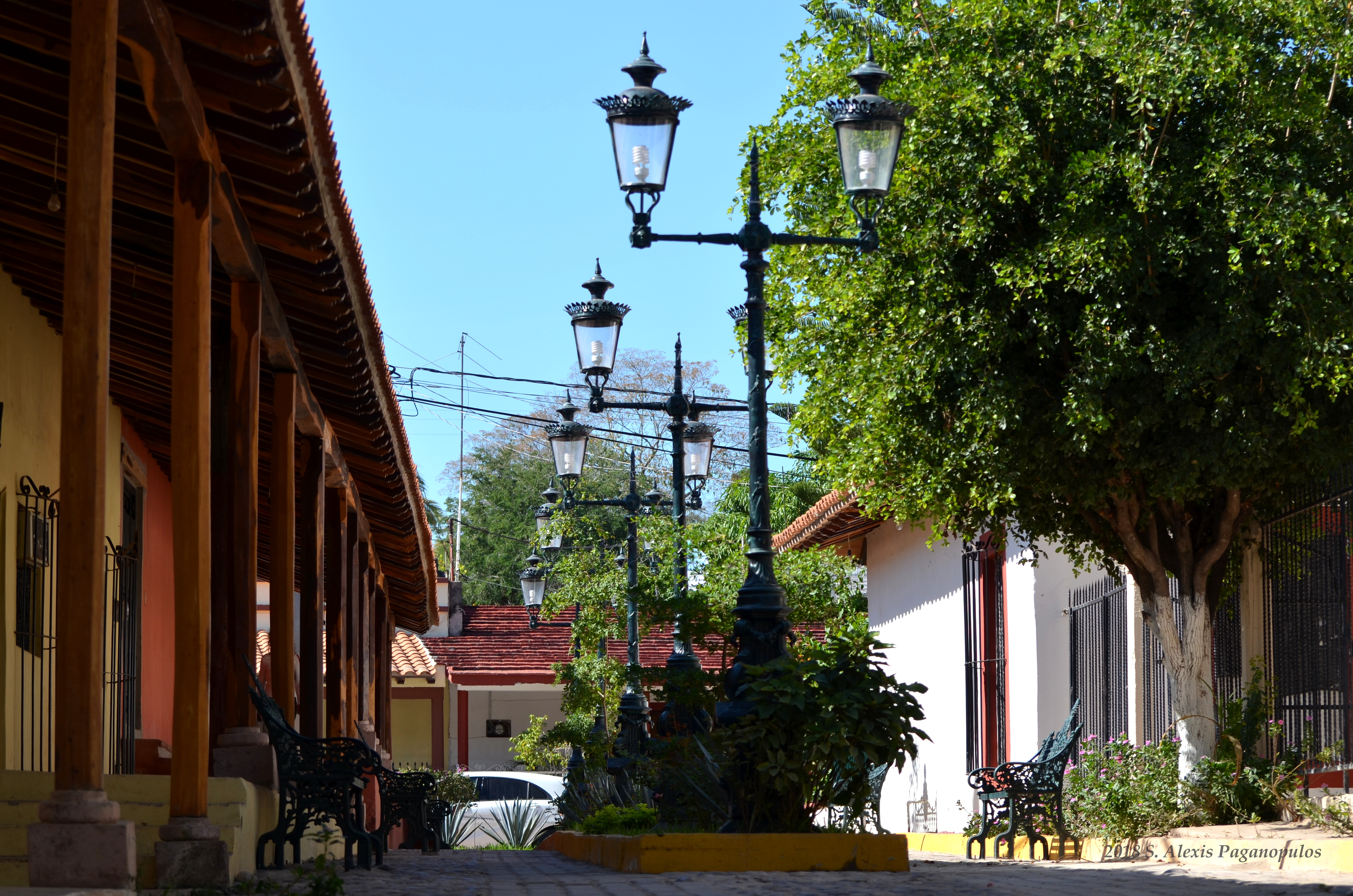
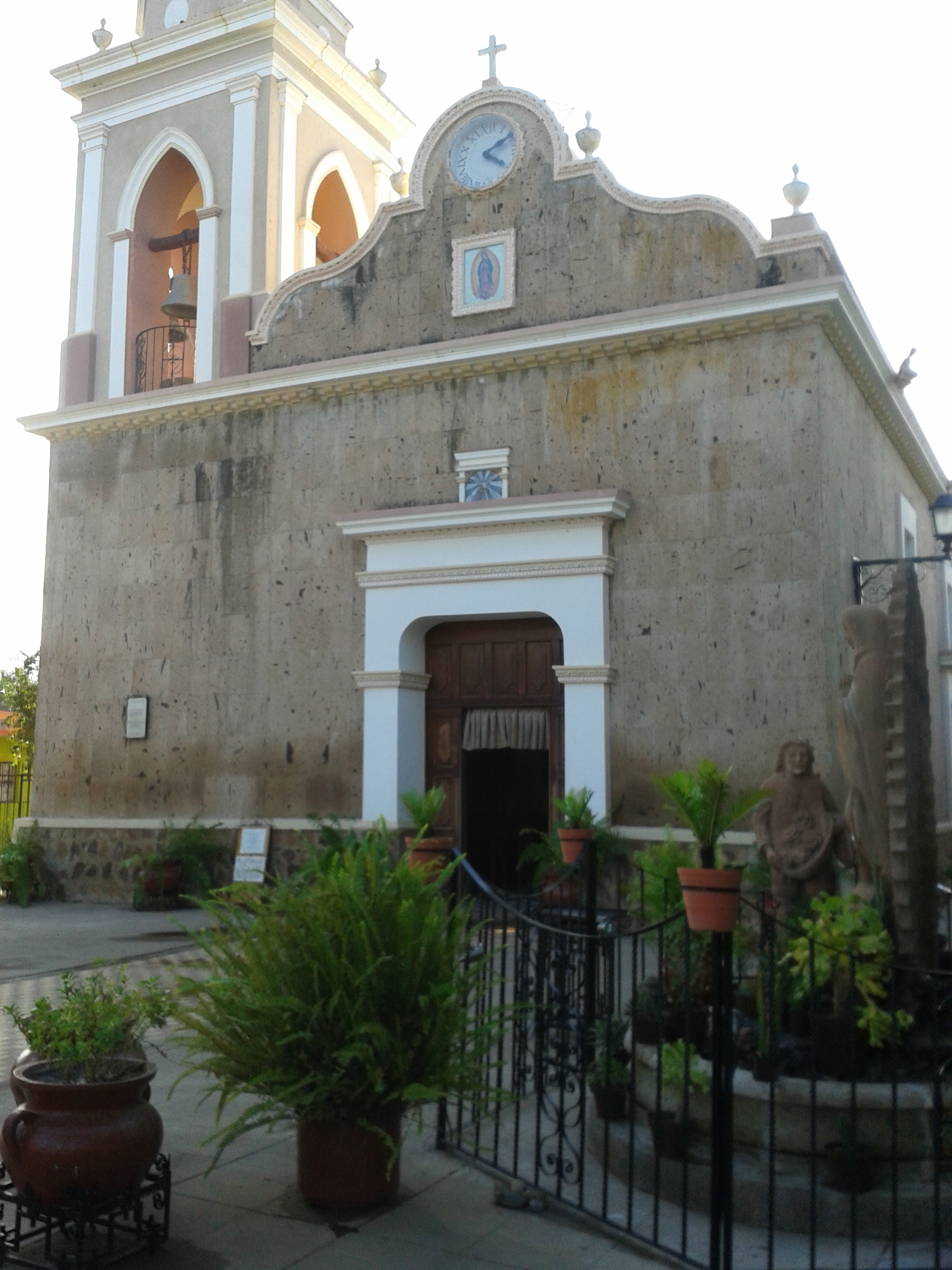
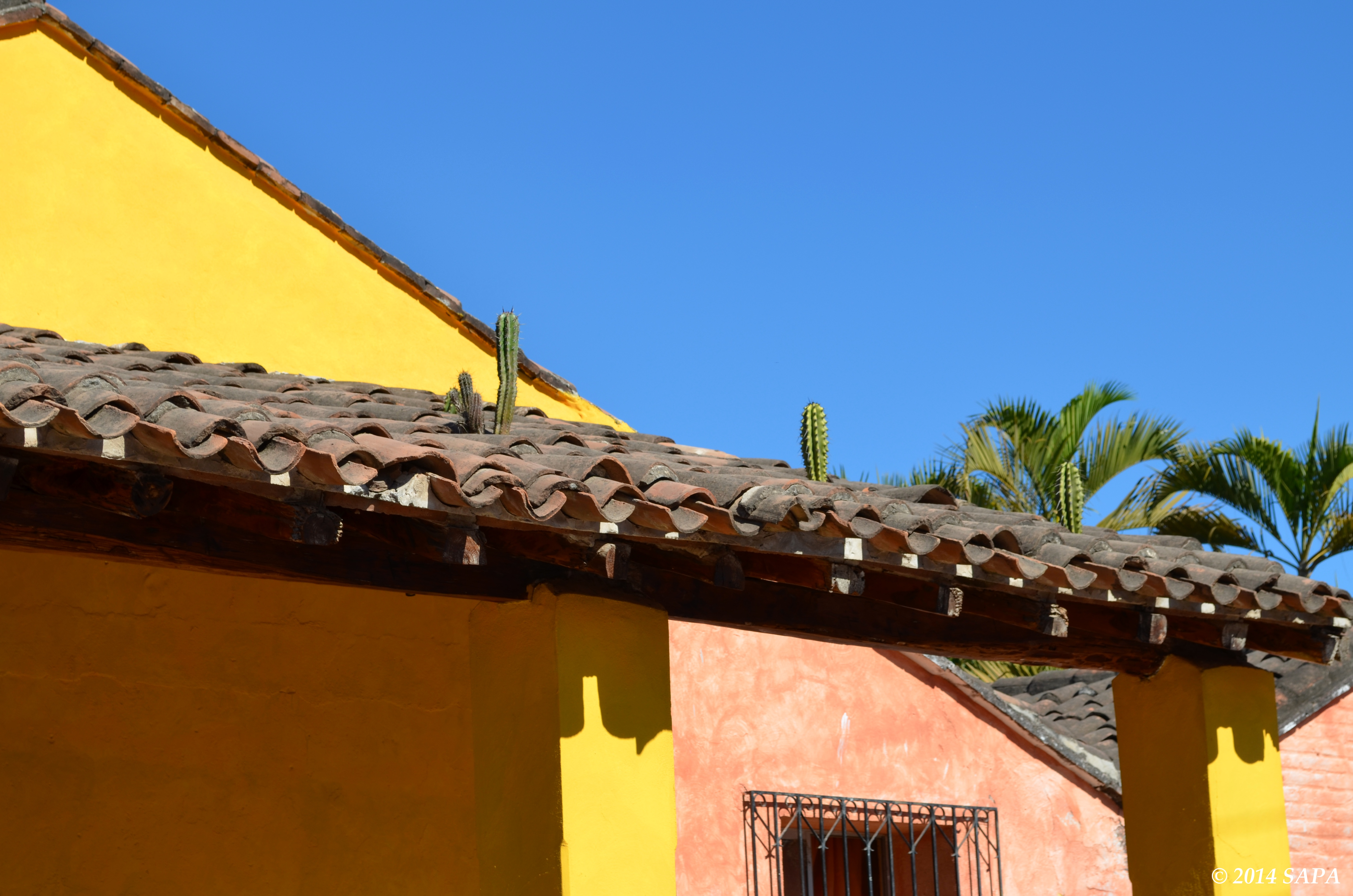
- Street in El Quelite Local church Architecture
- Interactive map of El Quelite
- Coordinates: 23.559496°N 106.468322°W
- Country: Mexico
- State: Sinaloa
- Municipality: Mazatlán

Population
  - Total: 1,733
  - Ethnicities: Mestizos
  - Religions: Roman Catholic Church
- Time zone: UTC-7 (Pacific (US Mountain))
- Postal code: 82350
- Area code: 669

El Quelite is a town located in the Mexican municipality of Mazatlán in the state of Sinaloa. It is located 37 kilometers from the city of Mazatlán. It has around 1,733 inhabitants. It is noted for its colonial architecture and El Mesón de Los Laureanos restaurant.
