= The Life and Adventures of Joaquín Murieta =

1854 book by John Rollin Ridge

The Life and Adventures of Joaquín Murieta: The Celebrated California Bandit
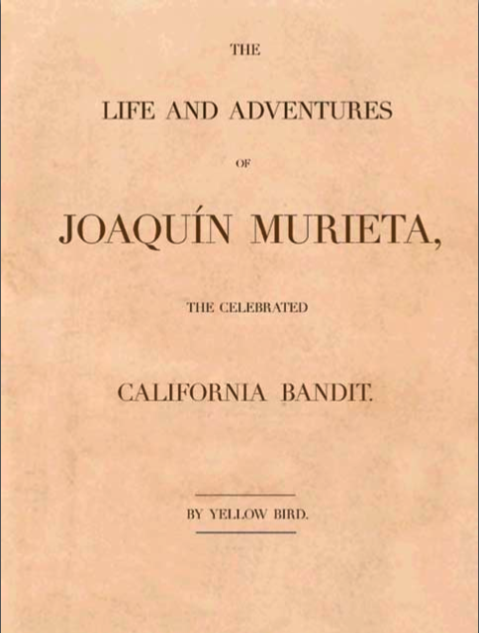
- Title page
- Author: John Rollin Ridge
- Language: English
- Genre: Fiction
- Publisher: W.R. Cook and Company
- Publication date: 1854
- Publication place: United States

The Life and Adventures of Joaquín Murieta: The Celebrated California Bandit (1854) was published by John Rollin Ridge, writing as "Yellow Bird". It is considered to be one of the first novels written in California and the first novel to be published by a Native American. The novel describes the life of a legendary bandit named Joaquín Murrieta who was once a dignified citizen of Mexico. The protagonist turns to a life of crime after traveling to California during the California gold rush.

Published as a fictional biography, the book was taken as truth by many historians of the time. The novel received mass attention and was translated to various European languages, including French and Spanish. The novel was also highly plagiarized and Ridge never received the economic gain he hoped for.

== Author biography ==
John Rollin Ridge was born in the Cherokee Nation in New Echota in 1827 (now Georgia). He was given the Cherokee name Chees-quat-a-law-ny, or Yellow Bird. His father Major Ridge and grandfather were assassinated in 1839 after Indian Removal, for having ceded communal lands by the Treaty of Echota in 1825. In 1850, Ridge killed a man over a horse dispute, but suspected him of being involved in his father's murder. Ridge fled to Missouri and then to California in 1850, where he attempted to try his luck in the Gold Rush. His wife and daughter joined him there.

After little success in mining, Ridge turned to newspaper companies for employment, and began writing articles. He also wrote The Life and Adventures of Joaquín Murieta (1854), a fictional account of an outlaw. He continued to work as a writer and editor for the Sacramento Bee and other newspapers. He died in Grass Valley, California in 1867.

== Historical context: borderland literature ==
The dime novel, intended for the general public, is an example of the literature of sensation and an early example of "borderland literature." The genre is believed to express the struggles of a person of mixed race or ethnicity to find his or her place while stuck between two very different worlds. These writings often include themes of transition, shifting identity, and allegiance. California, acquired by the United States in 1848 after the Mexican War, was an area where Anglo American, Native American, and Mexican cultures had been intermixing for hundreds of years. The novel expresses ethnic tensions in California after the Mexican War. Many Mexicans migrated to California after hearing about the Gold Rush there, hoping to be among those who struck it rich.

American discrimination against Mexicans and Spanish-speaking people was ever-present. United States settlers passed the foreign miner's tax law in 1850, which required foreign miners to pay twenty dollars a month to mine gold; it primarily was targeted against Mexicans. (Less than one year later the law was declared to be unconstitutional and repealed.) Ridge's novel The Life and Adventures of Joaquín Murieta was the first English-language novel describing California's Mexican community after the Mexican War.

== Chapter summaries ==
=== Chapter 1 ===
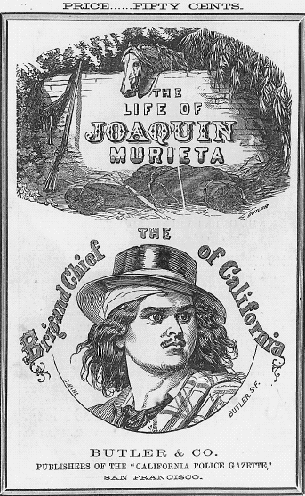
Cover of 1859 edition of The Life of Joaquin Murieta, the Brigand Chief of California

Chapter one introduces Joaquín Murieta as a Mexican born in Sonora by "respectable parents", who eventually grew to disapprove of the uncertain state of Mexico at the time. He was described to have an "enthusiastic admiration of the American character" and decided to risk his luck in the California Gold Rush when he was only 18 years old. His views of the Americans quickly began to change as he experienced racism and ridicule from the whites. A horrific scene is described by Rollin Ridge where a group of Americans, jealous of Murieta's mining success, beat him, tied him up, and then proceeded to rape his wife in front of him. Later, Ridge describes how Murieta, having recently received a horse from his half-brother whom he had just visited, was victimized by a mob that claimed the horse was stolen. Though Murieta expressed his disbelief and claimed to have no knowledge that the horse was stolen, the mob tied him to a tree, whipped him, then proceeded to his half-brother's house and hung him. At this time, Joaquín vowed that he would have his revenge on the Americans and slowly proceeded to murder the people involved in the mob. Joaquín, with the help of Manuel Garcia, Reyes Feliz, Claudio, Joaquín Valenzuela, Pedro Gonzales, and many others, began to steal horses and murder those who got in their way. Despite the various deaths and reports of theft in the area, Joaquín and his men were able to stay mostly anonymous with very few people knowing who the members of his gang and he were.

=== Chapter 2 ===
Chapter 2 begins by John Rollin Ridge describing how Joaquín built up his band, known as the banditti. Though he hired Indians to help steal horses, the leaders of the gang were all Mexican. Joaquín was known to appear as a successful gambler by day, but then became the much-feared bandit by night. In fact, Rollin Ridge went so far as to say that Joaquín was “disguised the most when he showed his real features”.

Though rarely known to reveal himself, there are few accounts given where Joaquín appears to have broken this trend. One such case occurred at Mokelumne Hill, while Joaquín was visiting a local saloon. Here, he heard Americans discussing how they would kill him on the spot if they saw him. Ironically, Joaquín jumps on table and declares, "I am Joaquin! If there is any shooting to do, I am in." and walks out of the saloon before the villagers had time to react.

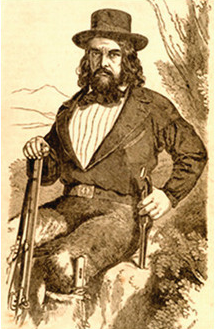
Artist's depiction of Capt. Harry Love, member of The California State Rangers

Being the infamous bandit that he was, many attempted to pursue Joaquín Murieta. Captain Harry Love was an express rider and Mexican War veteran, and had a history as infamous as Joaquín. Love followed the murders and robberies of the banditti to Rancho San Luis Gonzaga and nearly located Joaquín, who barely escapes unseen. Another man, the owner of Oris Timbers Rancho (from whom they robbed 20 horses) picks up Joaquín's trail and follows his band to Tejon Indian territory, where he makes deal with Indian chief Sapatarra in which he promises the chief half of the stolen horses if they are recovered by his tribe. Known to be a very cautious tribe, they capture Joaquín and men, bind them together, and steal back the horses. Eventually, they are tied to a tree and left with nothing.

At the end of the chapter, Reyes Feliz, a close companion of Joaquín's and a member of the banditti, is attacked by a grizzly bear and asks to be left to die with his lover, Carmelita.

=== Chapter 3 ===
In much need of supply, Joaquín and his men meet with Mountain Jim, one of their friends, who gives them clothing, horses, and guns. Later, they both travel to where they left the wounded Reyes Feliz, and they find him much alive and able to sit up. Not soon after, Joaquín is informed that Capt. Harry Love, the same man who had been pursuing Joaquín earlier, had captured a member of his team, named Gonzalez. Joaquín goes out to rescue Gonzales, but when Love sees Joaquín following him, he shoots Gonzales and flees.

After various robberies conducted by the team of bandits, General Bean, another man in pursuit of one of Joaquín's band members named Claudio, was spotted near San Gabriel, California. Joaquín conducted a surprise attack, and a member of the team named Three-fingered Jack stabbed Bean three times in the chest. Joaquín's team then arrives in the town of Jackson, California, where he sees a friend named Joe Lake, who was from "more honest and happy days". He promises not to kill his friend and asks him to keep quiet about his band being near Jackson. However, his friend betrays his promise and Joaquín, much to his regret, kills him.

=== Chapter 4 ===
Chapter four begins with the death of Joaquín's close comrade and his lover's (Rosita's) brother, Reyes Feliz, who is pronounced dead in the newspaper. Feliz's love, Carmelita, had wandered away in sorrow and was found frozen to death.

Only a few days later, a Mexican who claimed to know a friend of Joaquín's, warned of a band of armed Americans pursuing Joaquín and his gang. Joaquín, instead of fleeing, decides to surprise the group of Americans and a bloody battle ensues between 45 of Joaquín's men and 50 Americans. The battle ends with about 20 dead on both sides (including Joaquín's dear friend Claudio) and an unspoken stalemate. While the group was resting and healing from battle, news that Mountain Jim, the man who had so graciously provided clothing and weapons to Joaquín earlier, had been hung in San Diego.

=== Chapter 5 ===
In chapter five, Rollin Ridge describes how other members of Joaquín's gang were blood-thirsty killers, such as Three-fingered Jack, who chased a poor, wandering Chinaman with a knife just for fun. Joaquín, though, was often kind and noble, as was displayed when the band was traveling to Stockton, California. Arriving at a river, Joaquín demanded that a ferryman take them across the river and give them all his money. When the man was revealed to have only had $100, Murieta said, "I will not take it, you are a poor man, and you never injured me. Put us over the river, and I will pay you for your trouble." After arriving in Stockton, Joaquín saw an advertisement offering a $5,000 reward for him, dead or alive. Joaquín is known to have added, "I will give $10,000. JOAQUÍN", in pencil in front of a dozen unknowing villagers. He then departed before anybody could stop him. Having walked around the town afterwards in disguises, Joaquín heard of several successful miners who were going to be bringing in a large sum of gold by means of a nearby river. He quickly informed his group, and they managed to gather $20,000 worth of gold after a shootout on the boat transporting the miners.

After, Joaquín Murieta and his group met up at Arroyo Cantoova, a rendezvous point. Greeting Joaquín were 1,000 horses grazing in the valley, all gathered by Valenzuela, and 100 of his men. At this rendezvous point, Joaquín made a speech of his imminent goals to arm 2,000 men and travel to the southern counties, where he will "kill the Americans 'wholesale'". Then, he claims, that his comrades and he will be finished with their villainous behavior, divide their earnings, and live in peace.

=== Chapter 6 ===
Chapter six begins with the death of Guerra, one of Joaquín's men. Though many claim he died in his sleep due to an overconsumption of alcohol, the truth is that his wife had murdered him with a bit of hot lead dripped into his ear. Later, Joaquín decided to go to Calaveras County, one of the richest counties in California during the Gold Rush, and a highly sought-after destination for miners of the time. Ridge describes one instance where Joaquín approached 25 miners camping outside their mine. He greeted them with such good English that the miners could not tell if he were Mexican or American, and invited him down to eat with them. He declined the offer and sat on his horse to rest until a man named Jim Boyce came out and identified him as Joaquín Murieta. Furious at his men for not attacking, he yells at them to fire. They chase him to a cliff, where a very narrow miners' path along the mountain was the only escape. The fearless Joaquín, on his horse, dashed across the trail and barely escaped. Later, Joaquín forms a plan to travel several days, amounting to over 40 miles, in a circle, to trick Boyce and his miners into following a false trail. Then, Joaquín attacked them in the night and killed many of Boyce's men, while at the same time accumulating $30,000 from the dead men left behind.

=== Chapter 7 ===
Chapter seven starts with the capture of one of Joaquín's men, Luis Viñuela, who was put on trial for killing a miner in the mountains. During the trial, a man by the name of Samuel Harrington barges in and claims that he is an honest merchant of San Jose, California and that Viñuela had been working for him for four years, and could not be a part of a thieving band. He then hands over various letters addressed to Mr. Harrington as proof. Viñuela is then released, and Mr. Harrington was later revealed to have been in fact Joaquín in disguise, and that he had killed Mr. Harrington earlier and obtained his mail.

The chapter then shifts gears to Joaquín's companion Reis, who along with three others approached a cabin of two lovers. Struck by the girl's beauty, Reis kidnaps the girl, named Rosalie, and leaves her mother and lover, Edward, injured but alive. When Joaquín returns to Reis's camp, he scolds Reis for what he has done and spares his life only because Reis refrained from taking advantage of the girl. "I am surprised at you. I have never done a thing of this kind. I have higher purposes in view than to torture innocent females. I would have no woman’s person without her consent… I ought kill you, but since you have had some honor and manhood… I will let you off this time". Joaquín and Reis return Rosalie to her mother and lover, where she makes Edward promise not to hurt Joaquín. Reluctantly, he agrees.

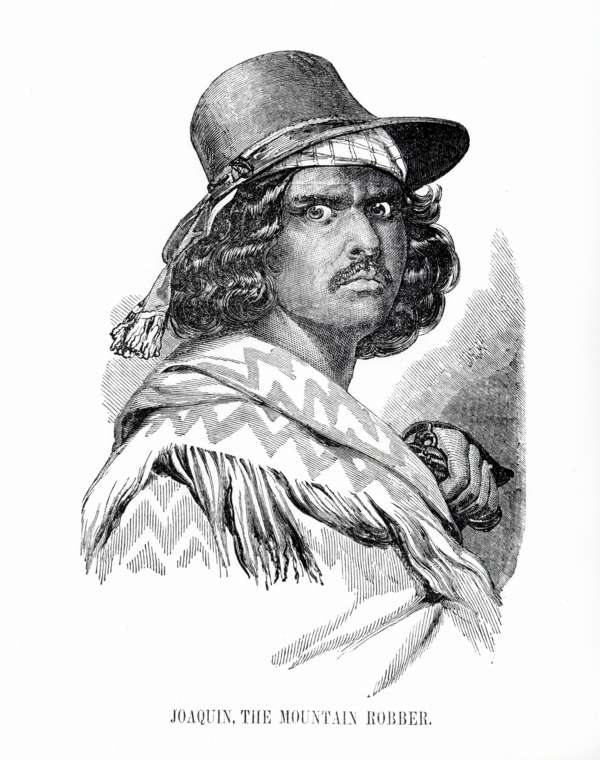
Thomas Armstrong's depiction of "Joaquin the Mountain Robber" as published in the Sacramento Union Steamer Edition on April 22, 1853

=== Chapter 8 ===
The bold bandit was ready to enter upon a series of the bloodiest scenes that ever were enacted in the same space of time in any age or country.

Ridge begins this chapter by describing how Joaquín had spies or friends indebted to him in nearly every town. Capt. Charles Ellas of San Andreas, California, happens to come across Joaquín without knowing him, but is unsuccessful in his capture. Ellas then resorts to hired spies to inform him of the whereabouts of suspicious Mexicans in the area. Several locations are revealed to him, including Chaparral Hill, a naturally fortified area, where Ellas, along with four other men, instantly set out. Upon his arrival, he comes across nine Mexicans who are later revealed to be Joaquín and his group. Ellas and his team manage to kill three Mexicans before they are required to flee the scene. After a brutal massacre at Yaqui Camp by Joaquín and his team, enraged citizens begin burning all possible houses and areas where robbers are believed to be hiding. Ellas, along with a man named Henry Scroble, form three companies whose goal is to break up the entire group of robbers. Next, a wild-goose chase between Ellas and Joaquín's group ensues where Ellas remains one step behind Joaquín. Tales of encounters between villagers and the group of Mexicans keep the trail hot for Ellas, but Joaquín's tricks make following them a difficult trail.

=== Chapter 9 ===
In chapter nine, "Yellow Bird" highlights various murders, thefts, and plunders conducted by Joaquín and the banditti. The group of Mexicans got so out of hand that a meeting was eventually held at the town of Jackson, where everybody agreed that they should search for Joaquín, under command of Charles Clark, Esq., the sheriff of the county. As John Rollin Ridge describes: "Thus was the whole country alive with armed parties… Arrests were continually being made… Pursuits, flights, skirmishes, and a topsy-turvy, hurly-burly mass of events occurred that set narration at defiance”. After many arrests and hangings of members of the banditti, Joaquín is finally spotted by a group of Americans at Forman's Camp along with four other Mexicans. The Americans instantly fire upon Joaquín's group, who though outnumbered, immediately gallop off on horseback. Not soon after, the Americans, in hot pursuit of the gang, hear screams from a group of Chinamen in the distance. Upon arrival of the men's camp, a dying Chinaman exclaims that the group of Mexicans had just robbed them of $3,000. The Americans, insulted by the bold and audacious feat, continued to follow Joaquín and his men, but were required to give up when their horses refused to follow due to exhaustion.

=== Chapter 10 ===
Chapter 10 begins with Joaquín deciding to leave Calaveras County and moving his plunders to Mariposa County. Here, the banditti ravage the area in much the same way they did in Calaveras. Ridge depicts a miraculous story where Joaquín was caught in his sleep by a man named Prescott. and group of 15 men, who were out to kill him. Having awoken by the sound of men in his room, his men and he instantly began shooting and managed to escape. During the encounter, though, Prescott himself had shot Joaquín in the chest with a double-barreled shotgun. Three-fingered Jack recounted, "How it come not to kill him, the devil only knows. I'm certain it would have done the job for me." Similar stories are told of Valenzuela, who robbed a house in Bear River.

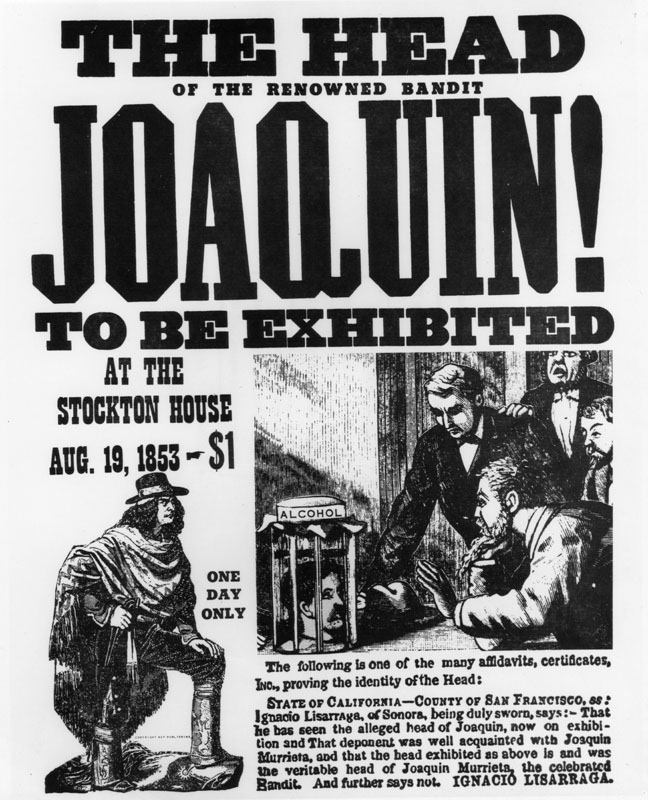
A poster advertising the display of the supposed head of Murrieta in Stockton, 1853

=== Chapter 11 ===
Chapter 11 begins with a bill being signed by the governor of California on May 17, 1853, stating that Harry Love would gather a team of no more than 20 men, paid $150 a month for no more than 3 months, would set out to "capture, drive out of the country, or exterminate the desperate bands of highwaymen who placed in continual jeopardy both life and property". At the same time, Joaquín was preparing for his grand plan and gathered all of his men from Sonora and other areas, along with 1500 horses at Arroyo Cantoova. John Rollin Ridge describes their preparations: "A shell was about to burst, which was little dreamed of by the mass of people because they merely looked upon Joaquín as a petty leader of a band of cutthroats!." Love and his men managed to locate Joaquín at Arroyo Cantoova, whose band now numbered around 80 men. Being greatly outnumbered, Love exclaimed that he was simply sent to gather a list of names for people involved in mustang horse hunting, so a tax could be collected. He then departed and continued tracing Joaquín and his men. Not soon after, with only eight men, Love found Joaquín with six men at a camp near Mariposa County, but he was unaware that Joaquín was a part of this group (he had never seen Joaquín and could not identify him by sight). The banditti attempted to escape, and Joaquín galloped away, in hot pursuit by Love and his gang. Eventually, Joaquín's horse is shot in the side and dies – a near impossible shot at such a great distance, as Love and his gang were following. The group eventually caught up to Joaquín and shot him three times. Three-fingered Jack's fate was not much brighter; soon after, he was shot in the head by Love.

After the battle, as proof that the great Joaquín Murieta had fallen, Capt. Love cut off his head and preserved it in alcohol. Love received $6,000 for the death of Joaquín Murieta, and collected spoils from the battle, including six revolvers, six Mexican saddles, a brace of holster pistols, and several pairs of spurs. Not soon after the death of Joaquín, the mighty organization he had formed was broken up and existed in fragments across California and Mexico, never again reaching the power or influence it had while under command of Murieta.

== Interpretations and other publications ==
Chapter six of Early Native American Writing: New Critical Essays by Helen Jaskoski includes an article written by John Lowe entitled, "I Am Joaquin!" This article provides not only biographical history of John Rollin Ridge, but also includes a summary of The Life and Adventures of Joaquin Murieta and its acceptance and prevalence into pop culture today. Lowe also includes an interpretation of the book as reflective of the life of Ridge himself and how he "has the American Dream snatched from under him". He also stresses the importance of the story as a reminder of what America stands for - a land of equality and freedom.

In Nineteenth-Century United States Literary Culture and Transnationality, John Carlos Rowe claims that Ridge's story on Joaquin Murieta has many political undertones that are reflective of his Cherokee roots. He claims that Ridge writes in favor of the Cherokee and Iroquois tribes while at the same time criticizing the Tejon and other California tribes. He also states that clear racism is seen in Ridge's writing towards the Chinese. He focuses on how nationalist ideology affects various races in the area, and the negative effects it this transitional period after the Mexican War had on Native Americans. In Minority Interaction in John Rollin Ridge's The Life and Adventures of Joaquin Murieta, Peter Christensen discusses how John Rollin Ridge, in his story of Joaquin Murieta, portrays Mexicans in America as courageous heroes, mocks Chinese as being feeble, weak, and pitiful (although very rich), and perceives Indians as cowards. Furthermore, he criticizes contemporary interpretations of the Mexicans as reflecting the Cherokee's - John Rollin Ridge's Tribe's - hatred towards the Americans and their government and critiques the viewpoint that the tale is a story of Robin Hood stealing from the rich and giving to the poor.

Chapter two of Decolonizing Gender: Indigenous Feminism and Native American Literature by Leah Sneider, however, posits that Ridge's rhetoric is not complicit in colonial ideology. Sneider identifies that Ridge writes with an "ironic reciprocity" in which Murieta's violence and racism can be seen as a consequence of his assimilation into white hypermasculine culture.

Chapter seven of John Rollin Ridge: His Life and Works by J. W. Parins gives an extensive and detailed historical, political, social, and cultural context of The Life and Adventures of Joaquin Murieta. Parins highlights California and Mexican/American interaction during the time the book was published, the book's various publications and reprints, and the portrayal of Joaquin Murieta in various other works. In the other chapters, Parins discusses the life of Ridge, as well as The Poems of John Rollin Ridge.

== See also ==
- List of writers from peoples indigenous to the Americas
