= Joaquin Valenzuela =

Mexican forty-niner

Joaquin Valenzuela (c. 1820 – 1853 or 1858) was a Sonoran fortyniner who came to California in 1849, during the California Gold Rush, with a small band of people from the vicinity of their hometown with Joaquin Murrieta. He subsequently became one of the leaders of the Five Joaquins Gang. Descendants of his family and those of former gang members said he died in 1853, at the hands of the California Rangers on Cantua Creek. The San Luis Obispo Vigilantes claim he was still alive when they took him to be hanged for his crimes with the Five Joaquins Gang in San Luis Obispo in 1858.

== Life ==
Joaquin Valenzuela and his brothers were born in Pueblo de Murrieta on the Rancho Tapizuelas, in southern Sonora near the border with Sinaloa. He and his brothers were cousins of Joaquin Murrieta. Joaquin Valenzuela came to California with his four brothers in 1849; with Joaquin Murrieta and his fiancé Rosa Féliz and three of her brothers Jesus, Claudio and Reyes Feliz; two of Joaquin Murrieta's Spanish born Murrieta cousins Joaquin Juan and Martin Murrieta that lived in nearby El Chinal; and several other men from Pueblo de Murrieta and its vicinity on the Rancho Tapizuelas. He later became one of the leaders of the Five Joaquins Gang, responsible for leading the gang's organized gathering of mustangs and stolen horses in California, and with his brother Teodoro, for their transport to Sonora and sale there.

The Daily Alta California, reported on August 5, 1853, about Captain Love returning from the fight on the Cantua:

San Joaquin News "Joaquin's Band – By the correspondence of the San Joaquin Republican we learn that Capt. Love arrived in Mariposa on Sunday with the head of Joaqain and a hand of one of his band, reserved in spirits, furnished by the surgeons of Fort Miller. Four of the bandits were slain in the fight, several others were severely wounded, and none of the Rangers were wounded. They bring one prisoner; another escaped and was drowned in the San Joaquin."

== Death, July 25, 1853 ==
Joaquin Valenzuela is said by various surviving gang members or their descendants, to have been one of the several unnamed gang members killed by the California Rangers during their attack on the gang at the Arroyo de Cantua, on July 25, 1853. He was later buried, with his head and both of his hands, by these gang members, and also according to them, the burial party included Joaquin Murrieta himself, who had been away in the mountains and had not been in the skirmish. According to the descendants of the family and former gang members the gang had been closing down their operation, gathering up and sending off the last of their droves of horses and leaving for Sonora when the Rangers struck.

== Official death, 1858 ==
Joaquin Valenzuela's brother Jesus Valenzuela had a nickname dating from his childhood in Pueblo de Murrieta, Ocho Moreno, and was also one of the named Five Joaquins Gang members, known to the State of California as Joaquin Ocomorenia. Jesus took his brother's name as an alias after Joaquin Valenzuela was killed at Arroyo Cantua. Under his name Jesus Valenzuela, became an acknowledged associate of Jack Powers and Pio Linares but still called himself Ochomorenia. Under the name Joaquin Valenzuela, Jesus worked on the Rancho San Emidio, living there with his family, but was known by some as a former Murrieta gang member.

In 1858, following the murders, robbery and kidnapping at the Rancho San Juan Capistrano del Camate, Jesus was arrested by a San Luis Obispo vigilante posse searching the Rancho San Emidio for the Rancho San Juan murderers. He was recognized by several persons as Joaquin Ocomorenia, thought to be the alias of Joaquin Valenzuela, of the Five Joaquins Gang named in the 1853 bill authorizing the California Rangers to hunt down that gang. On the basis of that identification as Joaquin Valenzuela he was arrested by the vigilantes who had believed Jesus was Joaquin Valenzuela who they believed went by an alias Joaquin Ocomorenia.

The Daily Alta California, reported on June 3, 1858, on his fate:

"Another Lynch Execution in San Luis Obispo County. — The Santa Cruz Sentinel of the 22d ultimo, informed us that one of the gang which committed the Baratier murder, was hanged in San Luis Obispo county on the 13th ult.; the day after the murder. The Sentinel of the 29th ult. says: "The next day (the 14th ultimo] a party of men, headed by the Sheriff, went in pursuit of the murderers, saw them once on a mountain, but lost them again. They returned to town with a Sonoran named Joaquin Valenzuela, alias Joaquin Ocomorenia, one of Joaquin Valezuela's crowd or gang of robbers. A Vigilance Committee was formed instantly. They tried Joaquin, found him guilty of murder, rape, and kidnapping an American child on the Merced river some time ago. He was then hanged."

Jesus did not alert them of their mistake and after a trial by the San Luis Obispo Vigilance Committee, he was hung under his brothers name. Later after Valenzuela had been executed, when Desiderio Grijalva was questioned after his capture, Grijalva disclosed that he had shot from behind, John Gilkey, a witness to their presence nearby at the time of the Rancho San Juan robbery and murders. He said that Jesus Valenzuela had afterwards dragged Gilkey fifty yards at the end of his riata.

Walter Murray a leading member of the San Luis Obispo Vigilance Committee and its apologist wrote to the San Francisco Bulletin:

"This man is also an old accomplice of Jack Powers, spoke of him as his patron, and is a man steeped to the lips in guilt. He is well known at the mouth of the River Merced, and on the San Joaquin, and owes justice a score which fifty lives can never pay. He was hung in full sight of the whole people of San Luis, in broad daylight, by the voice and assistance of all the respectable men of the county, and died acknowledging his guilt, asking pardon of his friends, and warning all malefactors not to tell their secrets, even to their own countrymen. "Porqite asi se pierde" said he — that is: "Thus you loose yourself."

Murray and the Committee unaware they had just hung Jesus Valenzuela, after a long, futile search by the vigilantes, believed Jesus Valenzuela had escaped their punishment for his crimes with the gang of Pio Linares at Rancho San Juan Capistrano del Camate. If Latta's informants were correct then Jesus Valenzuela had been executed and paid for his part in the Rancho San Juan robbery and murders and all his earlier crimes with the Five Joaquins Gang.

== Later dispute over Joaquin Valenzuela's Innocence ==
The Los Angeles Clamor Publico gave a long account of the lynchings in San Luis Obispo county, and was very indignant about them. The Daily Alta California, of 4 June 1858 translated a portion of a long editorial on the subject including this about Joaquin Valenzuela:

"Thus it is that justice is executed in this country, where they pretend there are laws, and rights and liberty. They lie! Here when they pretend to punish a crime, they commit another still greater."
"Following the example of the other towns of California in similar cases, a Committee of Vigilance was formed [in San Luis Obispo.] Parties of men started out in all directions to arrest suspected persons. A few days afterwards, this rabble, styling itself "The People," publicly executed, in San Luis Obispo, an innocent man, named Joaquin Valenzuela, generally known by the nickname of "Nacamereno." Don David W. Alexander, who has just arrived in this city, on whose ranch the unfortunate man was employed, says he was torn from his labor and the bosom of his family, and that he had never left his home for a moment. Here then is another deed of blood which will be a mark of infamy forever on the reformers of the morality and law in San Luis Obispo."

Walter Murray wrote in the Bulletin a reply to the Clamor Publico about Joaquin Valenzuela:

"Now we come to the innocent Joaquin Valenzuela. This man has never been charged with either the Nacimiento or the San Juan Capistrano murders. But he was an acquaintance and comrade of the murderers — brother to one, chum to another, and was proven before the committee to be as full of crime as an egg is full of meat. In 1853 he was a partner of Joaquin Murietta — the veritable Joaquin. It is notorious that he was one of the five Joaquins upon whose heads Governor Bigler set a price, and to catch whom Capt. Harry Love's Company of mounted rangers was organized.

"Just before that time he kidnapped an American child, Anne, daughter of an American named Smith, and brought her down to the San Joaquin River, where he and his Mexican female partner brought her up to learn Spanish and hate the Gringos. The Americans living there took the child away, and advertised for her relatives. The father made his appearance and claimed his child. He accompanied this Joaquin across the ferry on the San Joaquin, at the mouth of the River Merced. Joaquin returned; Smith never. The inference is that Smith was killed by the black villain. A skeleton supposed to be his was afterwards found a league or two from the ferry. I refer for these facts to D. P. Brown, of Stockton; to the mother of the child who lives there now, and to those who lived at and near the mouth of the River Merced, in the years 1853-54."

Murray went on about Valenzuela's association with Jack Powers:

"When the Harry Love's Ranger Law was passed, this Joaquin Valenzuela, alias Ocomorenia, came down to the Tulares and to Santa Barbara County. Here he made acquaintance with Jack Powers. In his company Powers inured himself to fatigue on horseback "in the pursuit of stolen or strayed cattle," as the great Jack's eulogist has it, but which rightly interpreted means, "in stealing his neighbor's cattle." There is evidence before the committee here, which will one day be printed, showing that Powers and Joaquin Valenzuela stole cattle together from Guadalupe, Santa Maria, and Nipomo, and drove them to the mines by way of the Tulares. He has been engaged in this nefarious pursuit off and on ever since he came to this section of the country. He was captain of a band of robbers near Purissima, in Santa Barbara County, nearly two years ago, and committed several robberies there. ... When he was being brought in, he told Captain Mallagh that he thought he ought not to be molested, as he had condescended to be honest for a year past."

"This man was invited by Jack Powers at Santa Margarita, on the night of the horse-race there, on November 30th last, to take part in the murder at the Nacimiento. He replied, "I have formerly been in such things, as you know, but I have given it up." He declined going. When arrested, and asked if he knew Powers, he said yes, he was his patron. He seemed to think that the magic name of Powers would be a tower of strength to him. When brought afterwards before the committee, and when he found out that Powers was compromised, he denied any acquaintance with him. Afterwards acknowledged that Powers had invited him to accompany him above on a "business speculation."

Murray criticized David W. Alexander for his defense of Valenzuela as an innocent man:

"This is the "innocent" man who has been torn from the bosom of his family by a mob and "done to death." Mr. David W. Alexander, of Los Angeles, says that this man " has never been absent a moment from his home." This gentleman forgot, perhaps, to tell the editor of the Clamor Publico, that in November last he loaned this man $100 to bring his wife, from Los Angeles; that he (Alexander) was informed at the time of the arrest, that at that very time when he was supposed to be in Los Angeles, he was here in San Luis in company with Jack Powers and other worthies, at the races in and near this place; that he stayed here several weeks, and that during that time instead of living with his wife, whoever the lady may be, he kept with an abandoned Mexican prostitute, for whose sake two men have been stabbed, and two shot within the last six months. For aught Mr. Alexander knows, this man was at the Nacimiento murder on December last. However, he is not charged with it. Now, as this gentleman has forgotten the above particulars, he has forgotten, doubtless, that this Joaquin is a notorious thief. How is it then that Alexander Godoy, of Cuyama, Mr. Alexander's next neighbor, and one of Mr. Fremont's veterans, is thoroughly acquainted with the man's character? How is it that this man's character is notorious to every one except Mr. Alexander? Is not this gentleman, like hundreds of other rancheros in the southern country (not Americans, however) content to hire a vaquero without asking questions as to his character, or even if he knew him to be bad, content if he thinks the man will not rob or murder him?"

== See also ==
- Five Joaquins Gang
