= Three-Fingered Jack =

'Three-Fingered Jack may refer to:

== A Person ==
- Three Fingered Jack, a name used for several outlaw characters, including:
  - Three Fingered Jack (Jamaica), name given to Jack Mansong (d. c. 1781), the leader of a band of runaway slaves in the Colony of Jamaica in the eighteenth century.
  - Three Fingered Jack (California), (d. c. 1853), a name given to him by the California Rangers who killed him, leader of a band of the Five Joaquins Gang, in the California Gold Rush. His real identity is disputed.
  - Jack Dunlop, (c.1872 – February 24, 1900), known as Three Fingered Jack, an outlaw in of the Arizona Territory

== A Place ==
- Three Fingered Jack, a volcano in Oregon.
