= California State Police =

Defunct law-enforcement agency

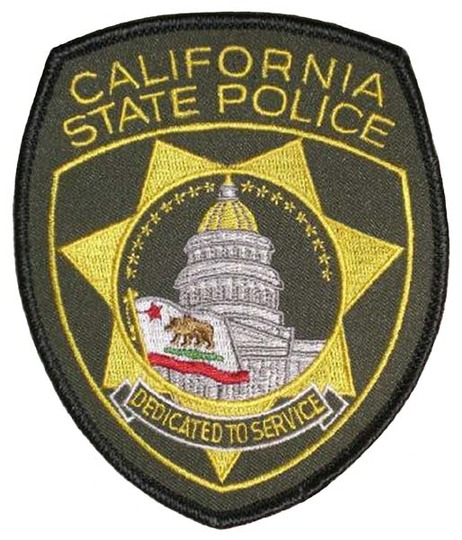
- California State Police patch
- Abbreviation: CSP
- Motto: Dedicated to Service

Agency overview
- Formed: March 15, 1887; 139 years ago
- Dissolved: July 12, 1995; 31 years ago
- Superseding agency: California Highway Patrol
- Employees: 10,000+ remained by 1995 (Prior to the CSP-CHP merger hundreds of CSP officers left the department to work for other Law Enforcement Agencies)

Jurisdictional structure
- Operations jurisdiction: California, United States
- Map of California State Police's jurisdiction
- Legal jurisdiction: California State Capitol
- Governing body: California State Legislature
- General nature: Civilian police

Operational structure
- Headquarters: Sacramento, California

The California State Police (CSP) was the state-level security police agency from 1887 to 1995 for the U.S. state of California. It was merged into the California Highway Patrol in 1995.

Founded on March 15, 1887, the police agency primarily served to protect the California State Capitol Building, the governor and other state officials, and other state agencies that did not have their own police force. The CSP also provided services to many different California state agencies, including performing tax seizures for the California Franchise Tax Board and Board of Equalization, as well as patrolling the California Aqueduct. They provided investigative services to elected officials through their Threat Assessment Detail and criminal investigations of crimes committed against the state through the Bureau of Investigative Services. Detectives and line officers routinely conducted investigations with other state agencies and allied law enforcement departments.

== History ==
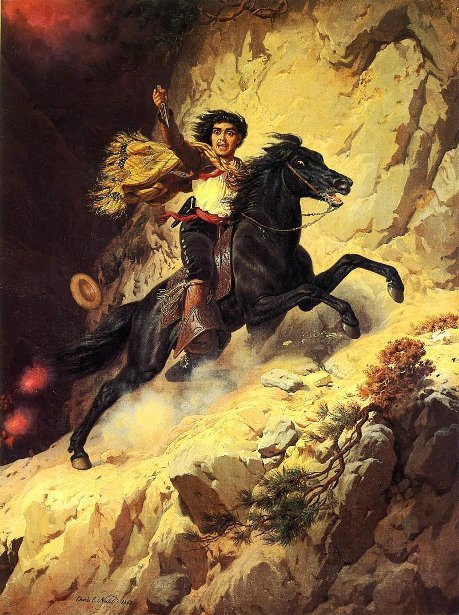
Joaquín Murrieta, called the "Robin Hood of California", was a notorious outlaw during the California Gold Rush.

The agency traces to 1853, when the California State Legislature authorized a law enforcement body called the California Rangers, their primary objective being to capture notorious gang leader Joaquin Murrieta. Following his arrest and execution, however, the rangers were disbanded. On March 15, 1887, the California State Legislature authorized a law enforcement body with former leader of the Rangers, Captain Harry Love, and one other ranger, as its sole members to protect the State Capitol and grounds. They were paid $100 monthly and grew to a force of 12 officers. In 1911 the legislature approved more positions, uniforms, and defined the department giving it the official name of, "California State Capitol Police". Eventually, as the department grew to approximately 400 personnel and its duties expanded, the word "Capitol" was dropped from the agency's name.

=== Public awareness ===
The California State Police (CSP) Division was a small agency, with its official title being a division of the California Department of General Services. Officers and patrol cars of this division were rarely seen outside of the state’s larger metropolitan areas, with its largest presence being situated in the areas of Sacramento (State Capitol Division), Los Angeles, San Francisco, Redding, and San Diego. Its aircraft could be seen flying along the California Aqueduct.

Some of the most visible personnel of the CSP were its State Security Officers (SSOs) who were peace officers while on duty. SSOs held powers of arrest as regular police officers under the California Penal Code (CPC), but were not full-time peace officers. Their powers of arrest were only while on duty performing their specific assignments. SSOs were usually at fixed locations at state buildings on foot beats. SSOs sometimes performed patrol (automobile) duties in very limited geographical areas such as Exposition Park in Los Angeles.

Despite the California State Police presence in large metropolitan cities, at the State Capitol, at busy State office buildings, on foot beats, on patrol in fully marked police vehicles on the streets and highways, there were many Californians who were still unaware that California had its own State Police. This public knowledge of the California State Police didn't fully come to light until its merger with the California Highway Patrol when it received major state news coverage in 1995.

At the time of the merger, the California State Police was the state’s oldest law enforcement agency (1887-1995 (~108 years)), a record that is still held today. The California Highway Patrol (CHP) was founded in 1929 and its officers were classified as "State Traffic Officers" until the merger. After the merger and subsequent charter responsibilities were taken over by the CHP, their official title was simply reduced to "Officer", thus dropping "traffic" from their current seven-point star badge.

While they did maintain security personnel at major State facilities, they also maintained SCUBA units, Air Patrol Sections with their own fixed wing aircraft, equestrian mounted units, special investigations personnel, EOD (Explosive Ordnance Disposal) bomb techs and equipment, Special Weapons And Tactics teams (SWAT), bicycle patrols, 4WD patrol units, regional detective squads, training personnel, Dignitary Protection Command, which saw to not only the security and safety of State elected and appointed officers, but also often to visiting dignitaries who might not have their own protective staff and provided training for like units from other agencies, Threat Assessment Investigations, armorers, and clerical personnel, as well as routine uniformed patrol officers and vehicles.

CSP sworn personnel were regulated and certified by the State's Department of Justice Commission On Peace Officer Standards and Training (POST). CSP officers were expected to, at any time and at any place, perform the same duties of any city, county or other state law enforcement personnel except those relating to custodial duties (jail/prison). As such, they were the State's oldest general law enforcement agency. Beyond the previously described duties, CSP personnel regularly served and executed State tax warrants, notices of seizure and maintained the peace (bailiff duties) in thousands of State Administrative Court hearings, meetings and procedures. The CSP regularly provided support personnel to other law enforcement agencies such as the State's Alcoholic Beverage Control (ABC), the State's Department of Justice Bureau of Narcotic Enforcement (BNE), State DMV investigations, Department of Health Services investigations, local law enforcement and coordinated State, Federal, Local Joint Agency Task Forces.

== Organization ==
The last Chief of the CSP was long-time Sacramento County Sheriff (1971–1983) Duane Lowe. Lowe served as a Deputy Commissioner of the California Highway Patrol (CHP) during the transitional period of the merger of the two organizations. Lowe retired in 1996, a year after the CSP and CHP merged into one agency.

=== Rank structure ===
| Title | Insignia |
|---|---|
| Chief | |
| Assistant Chief | |
| Deputy Chief | |
| Commander | |
| Captain | |
| Lieutenant | |
| Sergeant | |
| Officer II | |
| Officer I | |

== Penal Code Status ==
At the time of the merger into the California Highway Patrol the California State Police received its peace officer authority under the California Penal Code (CPC). California State Police Officers were defined as Peace Officers under CPC section 830.2 and its Security Officers were defined as Peace Officers under CPC section 830.4. California State Police Officers had to attend and pass a California Peace Officer Standards and Training (POST)-certified Academy consisting of up to 23 weeks of instruction depending on academy location.

== Equipment ==
In the final years of its existence the CSP fleet consisted of white Dodge Diplomats, then Chevrolet Caprices and finally Ford Crown Victorias with a large green and gold stripe running the length of the car. On the trunk lids in gold with green trim were the words “State Police". On each driver and front passenger door was a large seven-point gold-star badge with the State Capitol on the center seal. The words "State Police" in gold with green trim were on the front fenders.

Prior to 1983 the CSP fleet consisted of Dodges and Plymouths, also white, with no striping and the State Police shoulder patch as the door insignia.

CSP patrol cars (circa 1975-1983) were Plymouth Volares as part of a state fleet fuel saving directive by Governor Jerry Brown during his first two terms. State University and State Hospital Police downsized their vehicles or utilized Plymouth Fury IIIs with 225 cu in (3.7 L) Slant Six engines, known informally as "Campus Police Specials". The California Highway Patrol by nature of their mission was exempted from this directive.

== See also ==
- State police (United States)
- Capitol police
- List of law enforcement agencies in California
