= Joaquin Botellas =

Joaquin Botellas, known to the State of California in 1853 as Joaquin Botellier, one of the Five Joaquins, was a Sonoran born near Real de los Álamos that came to Alta California before the California Gold Rush. He was a brother to Refugio Botellas the first mail carrier in Alta California.

Joaquin Botellas mined with Joaquin Murrieta, in Murphy's New Diggins and took up Murrieta's cause against the mob that lynched Murrieta's elder stepbrother Jesus Carrillo Murrieta and whipped Joaquin on the false accusation of the theft of a mule. He became an active member of the Five Joaquins Gang riding with Joaquin Murrieta's own band.

In April 1853 Joaquin Botellas' name, appearing as Joaquin Botellier, was included in the list of the five Joaquins in the bill of the California legislature authorizing the California Rangers to hunt them down. Joaquin Botellas became fearful for his safety, and was in Monterey winding up his affairs before moving back to Sonora, when the battle of the Cantua occurred. Nothing further is known about him; presumably he returned to Sonora.
