= El Chinal =

Coordinates: 26°40′50″N 108°42′03″W

El Chinal is a town of the Álamos Municipality located in the southeast of the Mexican state of Sonora, close to the boundary with the states of Chihuahua and Sinaloa. It is located 57.2 km southeast of Álamos and 47.8 kilometers Northwest of El Fuerte, in Sinaloa. It lies northwest of Casanate in valley among the hills east of the Rio Cuchujaqui at an elevation of 243 meters.

El Chinal is the eighth largest population of the municipality according to the data of the Census of Population and Housing made in 2010 by the National Institute of Statistics and Geography (INEGI). El Chinal has a total of 342 inhabitants. It also has a municipal police station.
