= Joaquin Murrieta =

Historical figure in early California (1829–1853)

- Born: c. 1829; Álamos, Sonora, Mexico
- Died: July 25, 1853 (aged 23–24); Fresno County, California
- Cause of death: Gun fight in Fresno County
- Resting place: Hornitos, California
- Other names: The Robin Hood of El Dorado, The Mexican Robin Hood
- Occupations: Vaquero, gold miner, outlaw
- Known for: Outlaw leader during time period of California Gold Rush
- Spouse: Rosa Feliz or Rosita Carmela or Rosita Carmel Feliz

Joaquin Murrieta Carrillo (sometimes misspelled Murieta or Murietta) (c. 1829 – July 25, 1853), also called the Robin Hood of the West or the Robin Hood of El Dorado, was a Mexican figure of disputed historicity. The novel The Life and Adventures of Joaquín Murieta: The Celebrated California Bandit (1854) by John Rollin Ridge is ostensibly his story.

Legends subsequently arose about a notorious outlaw in California during the California gold rush of the 1850s, but evidence for a historical Murrieta is scarce. Contemporary documents record testimony in 1852 concerning a minor horse thief of that name. Newspapers reported a bandido named Joaquin, who robbed and killed several people during the same time. A California Ranger named Harry Love was assigned to track down Murrieta and was said to have brought his head in for the bounty.

The popular legend of Joaquin Murrieta was that he was a forty-niner, a gold miner and a vaquero (cowboy) from Sonora. His brother was hanged and Murrieta was horse-whipped. His young wife was raped, and in one version, she died in Murrieta's arms. Swearing revenge, he hunted down the men who had violated her. He embarked on a short but violent career to kill his Anglo tormentors. The state of California offered a reward up to $5,000 for Murrieta, "dead or alive."

== Controversy over Joaquin Murrieta's life ==
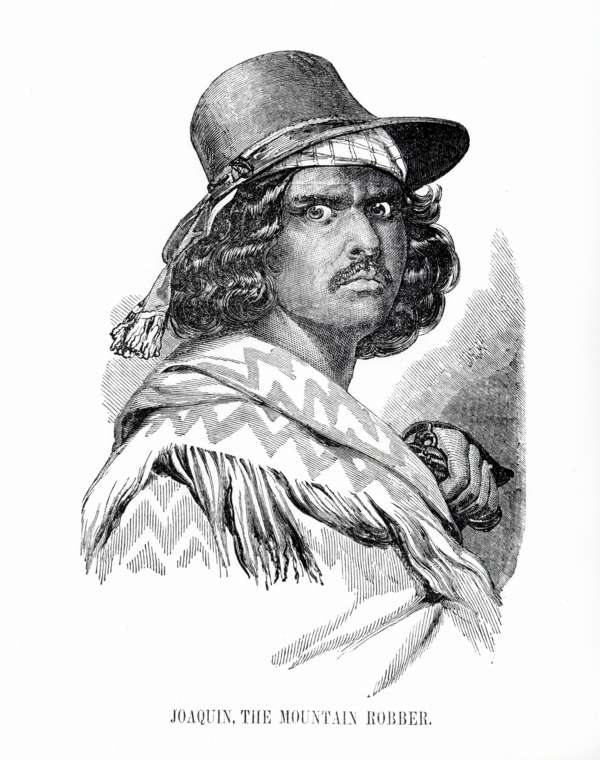
Artists depiction of Murrieta by Thomas Armstrong. (Note: The artist's depiction of Murrieta was disputed by historian John Boessenecker, who notes the image depicts a man in his mid-30s rather than early-twenties.)

Controversy surrounds the figure of Joaquín Murrieta—who he was, what he did, and many of his life's events. Historian Susan Lee Johnson says:

"So many tales have grown up around Murrieta that it is hard to disentangle the fabulous from the factual. There seems to be a consensus that Anglos drove him from a rich mining claim, and that, in rapid succession, his wife was raped, his half-brother lynched, and Murrieta himself horse-whipped. He may have worked as a monte dealer for a time; then, according to whichever version one accepts, he became either a horse trader and occasional horse thief, or a bandit."

John Rollin Ridge, grandson of Cherokee leader Major Ridge, wrote a dime novel about Murrieta. This fictional account contributed to his legend, especially as it was translated into various European languages. A portion of Ridge's novel was reprinted in 1858 in the California Police Gazette. This story was picked up and subsequently translated into French. The French version was translated into Spanish by Roberto Hyenne, who took Ridge's original story and changed every "Mexican" reference to "Chilean". Given the strong presence of Chileans and their visibility, in California the term "Chilean" garnered a wider meaning often including any Spanish-speaking non-European nationality and usually associated with a "bronze-coloured" skin tone.

Early 20th-century writer Johnston McCulley was said to have based his character Don Diego de la Vega—better known as Zorro in his 1919 novel of that name—on Ridge's 1854 novel about Murrieta.

Joaquín Murrieta has played multiple parts in Chilean historical memory. He was named a hero of the Gold Rush by a Chilean author, who named him El Bandido Chileño. In 1966, the Chilean poet named Pablo Neruda, who won a Nobel Prize, turned Murrieta's story into an opera that was named Fulgor y muerte de Joaquín Murieta, which was performed in Latin America, the USSR, Western and Eastern Europe, and some college campuses in the U.S. in 1968.

== Early life and education ==
Most biographical sources hold that Murrieta was born in Hermosillo in the northwestern state of Sonora, Mexico. Historian Frank Forrest Latta wrote Joaquín Murrieta and His Horse Gangs (1980) based on decades of investigation of the Murrieta family in Sonora, California, and Texas. He said that Murrieta was from the Pueblo de Murrieta on the Rancho Tapizuelas, across the Cuchujaqui River (known locally as the Arroyo de [los] Álamos). This was north of Casanate, in the southeast of Sonora and near the Sinaloa border, within what is now the Álamos Municipality, of Sonora. Murrieta was educated at a school nearby in El Salado.

== 1849 migration to California ==
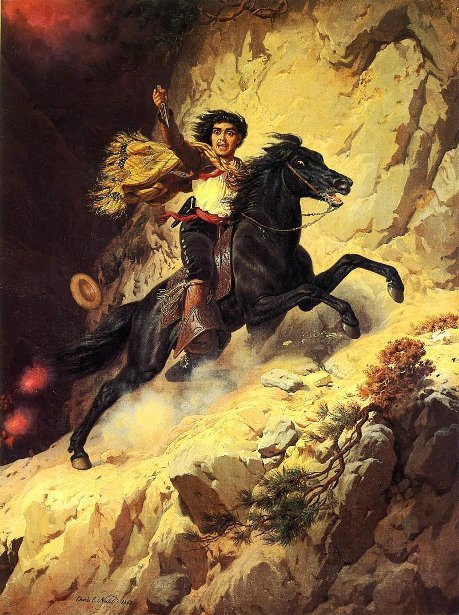
Joaquin Murietta (1868) by Charles Christian Nahl

Murrieta reportedly went to California in 1849 to seek his fortune in the California Gold Rush. His older Carrillo stepbrother Joaquin Manuel Carrillo Murrieta, who was already in California, had written him about the discovery of gold and urged him to come. Like many Sonorans, Murrieta and a party including his new wife Rosa Feliz, traveled there across the Altar and Colorado Deserts in 1849. This large family expedition included Joaquin's younger brother (Jesus Murrieta); Jesus Carrillo Murrieta, his other Carrillo stepbrother; three Feliz brothers-in-law (Claudio, Reyes, and Jesus); two Murrieta cousins (Joaquin Juan and Martin Murrieta; four Valenzuela cousins (including Joaquin, Theodoro, and Jesus Valenzuela); two Duarte cousins (Antonio and Manuel); and a few other men from Pueblo de Murrieta or nearby.

== Five Joaquins Gang ==
Murrieta encountered prejudice and hostility in the extreme competition of the rough mining camps. While mining for gold, his wife and he were supposedly attacked by American miners jealous of his success. They allegedly beat him and raped his wife. However, the only source for this account was a dime novel, The Life and Adventures of Joaquín Murieta, written by John Rollin Ridge and published in 1854.

Historian Latta wrote that Murrieta formed a gang, with well-organized bands, one led by himself and the rest led by one or two of his trusted Sonoran relatives. Latta documented that the core of these men had gathered to help Murrieta kill at least six of the Americans who had lynched his stepbrother Jesus Carrillo and whipped him on the false charge of the theft of a mule. The gang began to engage in illegal horse trade with Mexico, using stolen horses and legally captured mustangs. They drove herds of stolen horses from as far north as Contra Costa County, the gold camps of the Sierras, and the Central Valley via the remote La Vereda del Monte trail through the Diablo Range, then south to Sonora for sale.

At other times, the bands robbed and killed miners or American settlers, particularly those returning from the California goldfields. The gang is believed to have killed up to 28 Chinese and 13 Anglo-Americans. This figure is based on accounts of their raids in early 1853.

== Death ==
By 1853, the California state legislature listed Murrieta as one of the so-called "Five Joaquins", suspected criminals in a bill passed in May 1853. The legislature authorized hiring for three months a company of 20 California Rangers, veterans of the Mexican War, to hunt down "the five Joaquins, whose names are Joaquin Muriati [sic], Joaquin Ocomorenia, Joaquin Valenzuela, Joaquin Botellier, and Joaquin Carillo, and their banded associates." On May 11, 1853, the governor, John Bigler, signed an act to create the "California State Rangers," to be led by Captain Harry Love (a former Texas Ranger and Mexican War veteran).

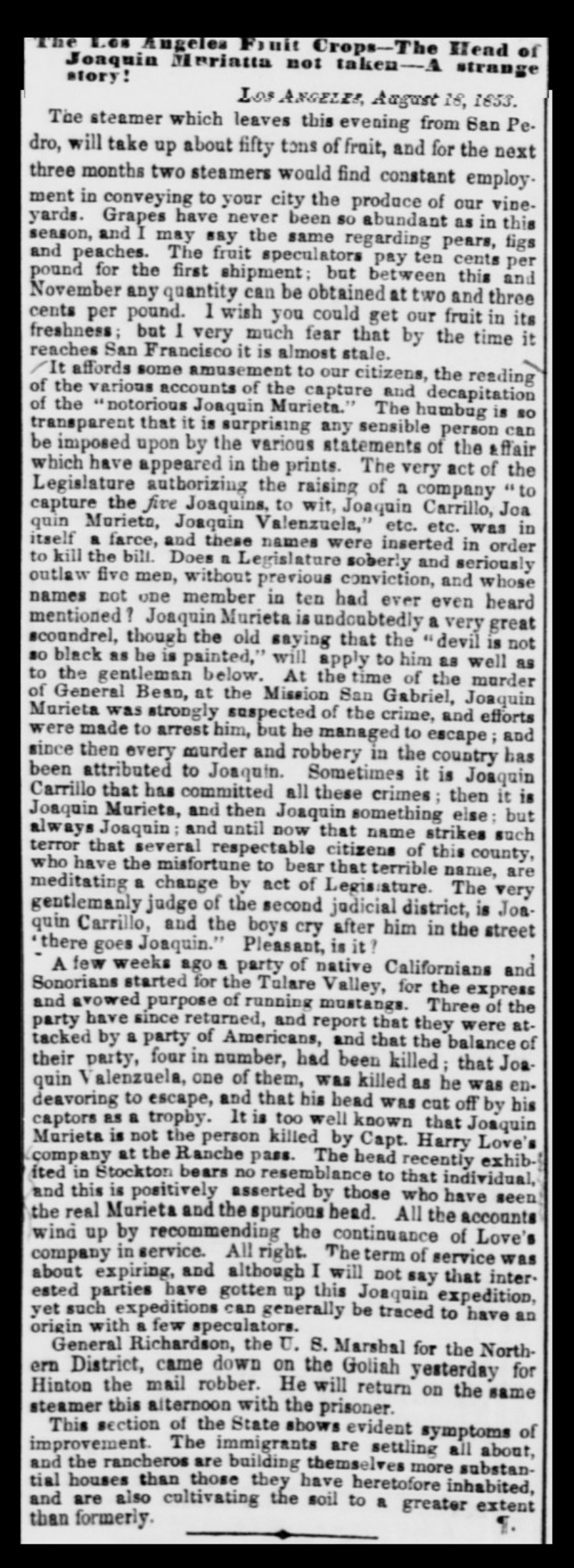
The head of Joaquin Murietta not taken - A strange Story - Daily Alta California' 1853

The state paid the California Rangers $150 a month, and promised them a $1,000 governor's reward if they captured the wanted men. On July 25, 1853, a group of rangers encountered a band of armed Mexican men near Arroyo de Cantua on the edge of the Diablo Range near Coalinga. In the confrontation, three of the Mexicans were killed. The rangers claimed one of the dead was Murrieta, and another Manuel Garcia, also known as Three-Fingered Jack, one of his most notorious associates. Two others were captured.

A California Historical Landmark plaque has been installed near Coalinga at the intersection of State Routes 33 and 198 to mark the approximate site of the incident.

As proof of the outlaws' deaths, the Rangers cut off the hand of Three-Fingered Jack, and the alleged head of Murrieta. They preserved these in a jar of alcohol to bring to the authorities to claim their reward. Officials displayed the jar of remains in Mariposa County, Stockton, and San Francisco. The rangers took the display throughout California; spectators could pay $1 to see the relics.

Love and his rangers received the $1,000 reward money. In August 1853, an anonymous Los Angeles-based man wrote to the San Francisco Alta California Daily, claiming that Love and his rangers had murdered some innocent Mexican mustang catchers, and bribed people to swear out affidavits as to their identities. On May 28, 1854, the California State Legislature voted to reward the Rangers with another $5,000 (~$140,501 in 2025) for their defeat of Murrieta and his band.

Some 25 years later, myths began to form about Murrieta. In 1879, O. P. Stidger reportedly heard Murrieta's sister say that the displayed head was not her brother's. At around the same time, numerous sightings were reported of Murrieta as a middle-aged man. These were never confirmed. His preserved head was destroyed during the 1906 San Francisco earthquake and subsequent fire.

Murrieta's nephew, known as Procopio, became one of California's most notorious bandits of the 1860s and 1870s. He was said to have wanted to exceed the reputation of his uncle.

== The real Zorro ==
Murrieta is believed to have inspired the fictional character of Zorro, the lead character in the five-part serial story, The Curse of Capistrano, written by Johnston McCulley, and published in 1919 in a pulp fiction magazine.

For some political activists of the late 20th and early 21st centuries, Murrieta has symbolized Mexican resistance against White Anglo-Saxon Protestant domination of California, as Spanish colonists, Native Americans, mixtos, and independent Mexicans were there first. The "Association of Descendants of Joaquin Murrieta" says that Murrieta was not a "gringo eater", but "He wanted to retrieve the part of Mexico that was lost at that time in the Treaty of Guadalupe Hidalgo" (after the Mexican-American War).

== Representations in media ==
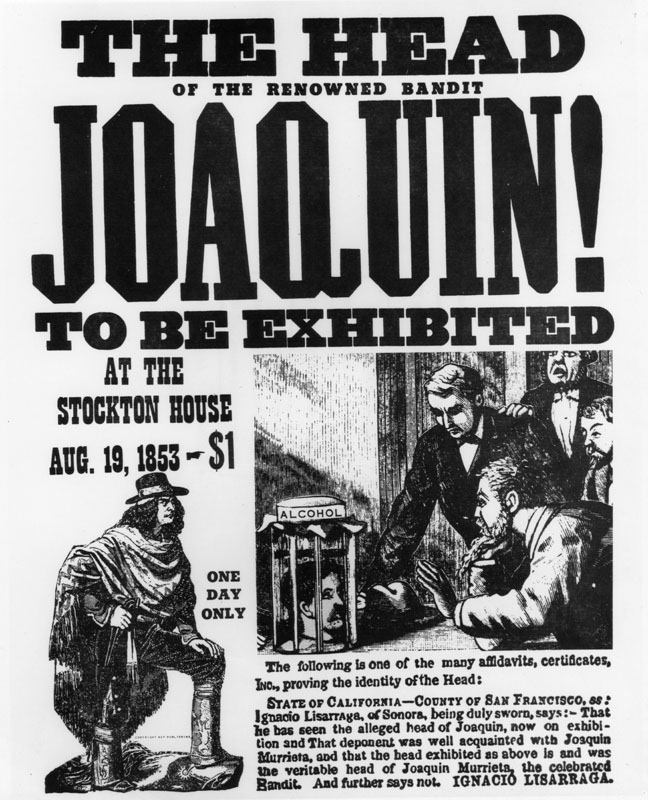
"The head of the renowned bandit Joaquin Murrieta to be exhibited...at the Stockton House on August 19, 1853. Ignacio Lisarraga of Sonora has given a sworn statement authenticating the identity of the head"

Joaquin Murrieta has been used frequently as a romantic outlaw figure in novels, stories, and comics, and in films and TV series.

=== Literature ===
Beadle's New York Dime Library # 165 (December 21, 1881)

- by Henry Llewellyn Williams, Joaquin, (the Claude Duval of California), or, The marauder of the mine (1865)
- Joaquin Miller, Songs of the Sierras (1871)
- Joseph E. Badger, Jr., Joaquin, the terrible in Beadle's New York Dime Library ; no. 165 (1881)
- Louis Kretschman, Trail of Vengeance (1977)
- John Rollin Ridge, The Life and Adventures of Joaquín Murieta (1854): Parts of this were translated into French and Spanish.
- Burns, Walter Noble (1932). The Robin Hood of El Dorado. New York: Coward-McCann, Inc.
- Yellow Bird (John Rollin Ridge), The Life and Adventures of JOAQUIN MURIETA, University of Oklahoma Press, Norman, 1955. With introduction by Joseph Henry Jackson, a reprint of the only known copy of the 1854 original book by John Rollin Ridge.
- Chilean Nobel laureate Pablo Neruda's play Fulgor y Muerte de Joaquín Murieta, (tr. The Splendor and Death of Joaquin Murieta by Ben Belitt, 1972)
- Robert Gaillard, L'Homme aux Mains de Cuir (The Man with the Leather Hands) (1963 in French)
- Isabel Allende, Daughter of Fortune (1999), includes the mythical figure of Murrieta.
- Alexei Rybnikov and Pavel Grushko's opera, Звезда и смерть Хоакина Мурьеты (Zvezda i smert' Khoakina Mur'ety – The Star and Death of Joaquin Murieta), 1976, is based on Pablo Neruda's play.
- Sid Fleischman, Bandit's Moon, (1998), children's novel.
- T. Jefferson Parker's novel L.A. Outlaws (2008), features Murietta as an ancestor of some of the main characters.
- "The History & Adventures of the Bandit Joaquin Murietta" (2012) a novella by Stanley Moss (b. 1948), retelling the legend of the outlaw intertwined with a memoir
- "This is a Suit" – a slam poem by Joaquin Zihuatanejo.
- "The California Trail" by Ralph Compton, a small part in chapters 22 and 23
- In Sunset Specters by Gary Jonas, the purported head of Joaquin Murrieta was preserved in a jar at Doctor Jordan’s Museum of Horrors in San Francisco in the late-1800s.
- Jeffrey J. Mariotte and Peter Murrieta, Blood and Gold: The Legend of Joaquin Murrieta (2021). Written by one of Murrieta's own descendants, the novel tells the story of how Joaquin Murrieta grew to become a legend.

=== Film, radio, and television ===
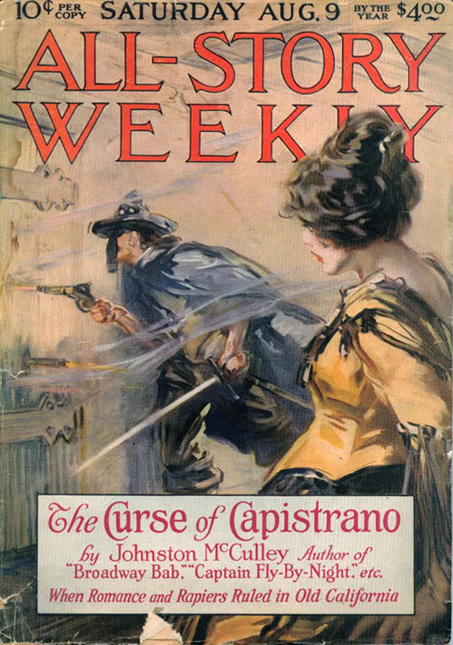
Zorro's first appearance, in the August 1919 issue of The All-Story

- Timeless, United States NBC TV series, Season 2, Episode.11, "Miracle of Christmas p.1-2, Season Finale, Dec.20, 2018, TV-PG, 2 hours runtime, During Part 1., Murrieta is played by Paul Lincoln Alayo. He assists the Team to obtain Gold at the onset of the California Goldrush
  - Rawhide, United States CBS TV Series, May 3, 1963, episode "Incident of White Eyes" with Nehemiah Persoff as Domingo, suspected to be Joaquin Murrieta
- The Robin Hood of El Dorado, 1936 film by William A. Wellman with Warner Baxter in the leading role.
- Family Theater radio program, June 21, 1950 broadcast, "Joaquin Murietta" with Ricardo Montalbán as the title character.
- The Bandit Queen, 1950 film by William Berke with Phillip Reed as Murrieta.
- The Adventures of Kit Carson, 1951 series television premiere episode, "California Bandits", with Rico Alaniz as Murrietta.
- The Man Behind the Gun, (1953 film) Murrieta aids an undercover army officer fight insurrectionists who want Southern California to secede and become a slave state in 1850s Los Angeles. Robert Cabal as Joaquin Murrieta
- Stories of the Century, 1954 television series, episode "Joaquin Murrieta" with Rick Jason in the starring role
- Death Valley Days, long running television and radio Western anthology series, episodes "I Am Joaquin" (1955) with Cliff Fields (credited as Field) as Murrieta; and "Eagle in the Rocks" (1960) with Ricardo Montalbán playing Murrieta.
- The Last Rebel a 1958 Mexican film with Carlos Thompson as Murrieta.
- The Firebrand a 1962 film with Valentin de Vargas as Murrieta.
- Murieta, a 1965 Spanish Western directed by George Sherman with Jeffrey Hunter as Murrieta.
- The Big Valley, United States ABC TV series, 1967, episode "Joaquin" with Fabrizio Mioni as Juan Molina, suspected to be Joaquin Murrieta
- The Desperate Mission, United States television movie, 1969, with Ricardo Montalbán as Joaquin Murrieta
- Faces of Death II, 1981 fake documentary film about death. Murrieta's head in the jar was believed to have survived the earthquake, and was sold to different collectors; its current "owner" has it on display, and explains the legend. However, the head is a wax fake that was formerly on display in the now-closed Almaden Museum in San Jose.
- The Star and Death of Joaquin Murieta, a 1982 Soviet musical drama film with Andrey Kharitonov as Murrieta.
- The Mask of Zorro (1998 film) features a youthful Joaquin Murrieta and his death at the hands of Captain Harrison Love (A Fictionalized version of Murrieta's real killer Harry Love). Joaquin's fictional brother Alejandro (Antonio Banderas) assumes the role of Zorro, and kills Love in revenge. Victor Rivers played Joaquin and Matt Letscher played Capt. Love.
- Murrieta is referenced in CSI S05E12 "Snakes" by a suspect claiming to be his descendant and therefore protected by him.
- Behind The Mask of Zorro (2005) a History Channel documentary about Murrieta and how he inspired the character of Zorro.
- The Head of Joaquin Murrieta, (2015) PBS short-documentary. As producer John Valadez seeks the head of Murrieta, and seeks to bury it.
- Timeless, (2018) in the first half of the two-part series finale "The Miracle of Christmas". Murrieta is played by Paul Lincoln Alayo.
- The Head of Joaquin Murrieta (La cabeza de Joaquín Murrieta), (2023) Amazon Studios series, made in Mexico.
- Blood & Gold, (2022–2023) Realm fictionalized podcast series chronicling Murrieta's life and career.

=== Comics ===
- Joaquin Murrieta in Desperado #2, Lev Gleason, Aug 1948, art by Dan Barry
- In 1950, Joaquin Murietta appears on comic strip Casey Ruggles by Warren Tufts.
- Death to Gringos! in Jesse James #7, Avon Periodicals, May 1952, art by Howard Larsen
- The California Terror! in Badmen of the West #2 [A-1 #120], Magazine Enterprises, 1954
- The Fabled Killer-Caballero Of California in Western True Crime #4, Fox Feature Syndicate, Feb 1949
- Robin Hood of the Sierras, in Prize Comics Western #v9#1, Prize Comics, March-April 1950, art by Mart Bailey

=== Music ===
- "Así Como Hoy Matan Negros," recorded by Víctor Jara and Inti-illimani, based on Pablo Neruda and Sergio Ortega's collaboration Fulgor y Muerte de Joaquín Murieta.
- "Cueca de Joaquín Murieta" recorded by both Víctor Jara and Quilapayún, in the style of Chile's national dance, the cueca – the song is featured on the album X Vietnam
- "Premonición de la Muerte de Joaquin Murieta" (Premonition of the death of Joaquin Murieta), a tribute to Murrieta, performed by Quilapayún – the song is featured on the album Quilapayun Chante Neruda
- "The Ballad of Joaquin Murrieta", performed by the Sons of the San Joaquin on the album Way Out Yonder.
- "The Bandit Joaquin" recorded by Dave Stamey
- "Archangel, The Murderer" performed by Long Island Folk Pop group Fortune & Spirits, opening track to the album "Harbor Lights Lead Home"
- "Murieta's Last Ride" and "Rosita", recorded by Beat Circus on the album These Wicked Things
- "Murrietta's Head" written and recorded by Dave Alvin on the album Eleven Eleven
- "Joaquin Murietta" by Spectra Paris
- "Joaquin Murrieta, 1853" by Bob Frank and John Murry
- "Corrido de Joaquin Murrieta" by Los Alegres de Terán
- "Stella Ireland and Lady Luck" by American folk singer/songwriter/guitarist Debby McClatchy
- "Adios Querrida" recorded by Wayne Austin on the album "By the Old San Joaquin"
- "The Star and Death of Joaquin Murieta", a 1976 rock opera by Alexey Rybnikov, based on "Fulgor y muerte de Joaquín Murieta" by Pablo Neruda.
- "Del Gato" recorded by Gene Clark and Carla Olson, from the album So Rebellious a Lover, 1987, written by Gene Clark/Rick Clark
- "La Leyenda de Joaquin Murieta" ballet by Jose Luis Dominguez (Chilean composer/conductor). Released by Naxos Records in 2016.
- "Fulgor y muerte de Joaquín Murieta" recorded by Olga Manzano and Manuel Picón, based on Pablo Neruda, in 1974.
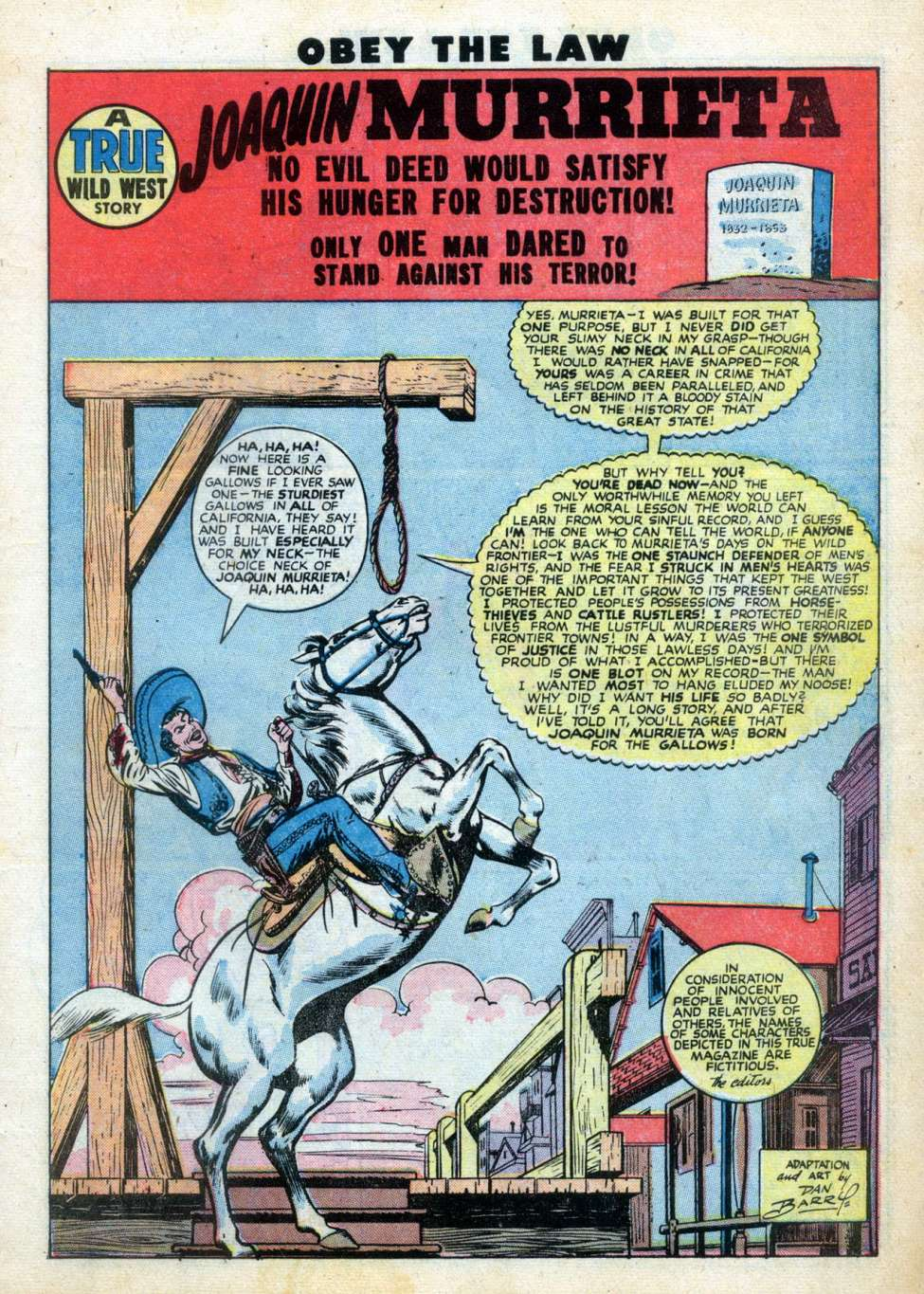
Joaquin Murrieta (Aug 1948), art by Dan Barry.

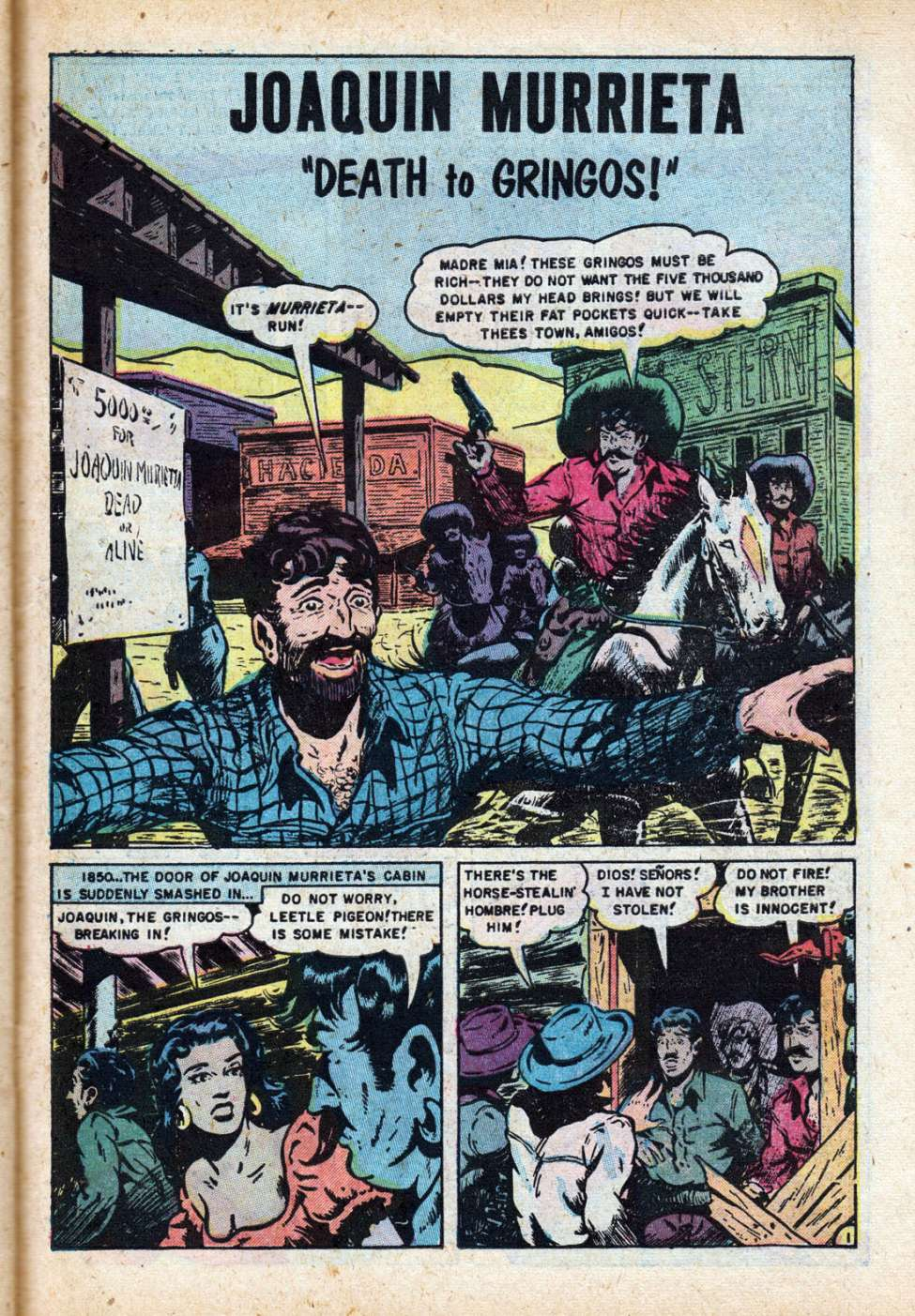
Death to Gringos! (May 1952), art by Howard Larsen.

In the late 20th century a Los Angeles Chicano community center was named Centro Joaquin Murrieta de Aztlan.

== See also ==
- Salomon Pico
- Tiburcio Vasquez
- Gregorio Cortez

== Works cited and further reading ==
- Boessenecker, John (October 21, 2025). Bring Me the Head of Joaquin Murrieta: The Bandit Chief Who Terrorized California and Launched the Legend of Zorro. Harlequin. ISBN 978-0-3697-4844-7.
- Yellow Bird (John Rolin Ridge), The Life and Adventures of Joaquin Murieta, University of Oaklahoma Press, Norman, 1955. With introduction by Joseph Henry Jackson, a reprint of the only known copy of the 1854 original book by John Rolin Ridge.
- Ridge, John Rolin, The Life and Adventures of Joaquin Murieta the Celebrated California Bandit. Third Edition, Revised and Enlarged by the Author, F. MacCrellish & Co., San Francisco, 1874. Joaquin Murrieta, pp. 3–40.
- Jackson, Joseph Henry, Bad Company, The Story of California's Legendary and Actual Stage-Robbers, Bandits, Highwaymen, and Outlaws, from the Fifties to the Eighties. Reprint of the first edition, published in 1939. Bison Books, 1977.
- Frank F. Latta, Joaquin Murrieta and His Horse Gangs, Bear State Books, Santa Cruz, California. 1980. xv, 685 pages. Illustrated with numerous photos. Index. Photographic front endpapers.
- Varley, James F., The Legend of Joaquin Murrieta, California's Gold Rush Bandit, Big Lost River Press, Twin Falls, ID, 1995. Includes the California Gazette, February 21, 1852, Confession of Teodor Vasquez in Appendix A.
- Paz, Ireneo (1904). Vida y Aventuras del Mas Celebre Bandido Sonorense, Joaquin Murrieta: Sus Grandes Proezas En California (in Spanish) (English translation by Francis P. Belle, Regan Pub. Corp., Chicago, 1925. Republished with introduction and additional translation by Luis Leal as Life and Adventures of the Celebrated Bandit Joaquin Murrieta: His Exploits in the State of California, Arte Publico Press, 1999. ed.). Mexico City.
- John Boessenecker, Gold Dust and Gunsmoke: Tales of Gold Rush Outlaws, Gunfighters, Lawmen, and Vigilantes, Wiley, 1999.
- Roaring Camp: The Social World of the California Gold Rush. New York: W.W. Norton. 2000. ISBN 978-0393320992.
- Seacrest, William B., The Man From The Rio Grande: A Biography of Harry Love, Leader of the California Rangers who tracked down Joaquin Murrieta, The Arthur H. Clark Company, Spokane, 2005. Includes a very extensive account of the outlaws career including many quotes drawn from period news sources and personal accounts.
- Wilson, Lori Lee, The Joaquin Band, The History behind the Legend, University of Nebraska Press, Lincoln, 2011.
- Iddings, Ray, Joaquin Murrieta, The True Story from News Reports of the Period, Create Space, 2016. Includes military reports and news reports from 1846–1931.
