= John Rollin Ridge =

American novelist and newspaper editor (1827–1867)

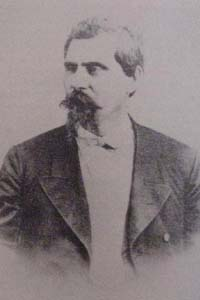
- Born: Chee-squa-ta-law-ny (Yellow Bird) – more accurately, "tsisgwa daloni" March 19, 1827; New Echota, Cherokee Nation (now Georgia)
- Died: October 5, 1867 (aged 40); Grass Valley, California, U.S.
- Cause of death: encephalitis lethargia ("Brain fever")
- Resting place: Grass Valley, California
- Other name: Chee-squa-ta-law-ny (Yellow Bird)
- Occupations: Novelist, newspaperman
- Spouse: Elizabeth Wilson
- Parent(s): John Ridge; Sarah Bird Northrup

Signature
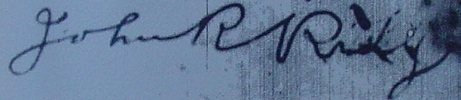

John Rollin Ridge (Cherokee name: Cheesquatalawny, or Yellow Bird, March 19, 1827 – October 5, 1867), a member of the Cherokee Nation, is considered the first Native American novelist. After moving to California in 1850, he began to write. He is known for his novel The Life and Adventures of Joaquin Murieta: The Celebrated California Bandit (1854), based on a notorious outlaw of the period.

His father John Ridge had been assassinated in 1839 in Indian Territory, after removal, by Cherokee who condemned his having signed a treaty to cede communal land to the United States. Ridge was taken by his mother to Fayetteville, Arkansas, for safety. He later attended school in Massachusetts. After returning to Arkansas, he studied the law, set up a practice and married.

In 1850, due to the California gold rush, he went west where his wife and daughter later joined him. There he started writing – both poetry and essays. In his novel and other works, he criticized American racism toward Mexicans, several years after the war by which the United States acquired California and much of the Southwest. After the American Civil War, he was among the Cherokee delegation that negotiated a new treaty for peace with the United States.

== Biography ==
=== Early life and education ===
Born in 1827 in New Echota, Georgia, he was the son of John Ridge and his wife Sarah Bird Northrup, a European American woman from Cornwall, Connecticut. His father had attended the Foreign Mission School there, beginning in 1819. Sarah's father was steward of the school. His parents married in 1824.

Both his father and grandfather Major Ridge, were signatories to the Treaty of New Echota, which Congress affirmed in early 1836. By this, they ceded Cherokee lands east of the Mississippi River. The tribe had been under pressure to move from state and federal governments, and was ultimately forced to remove to west of the Mississippi River, on what is known as the Trail of Tears. At the age of twelve, Ridge witnessed his father's assassination in Indian Territory at the hands of supporters of Cherokee leader John Ross, who had vehemently opposed the treaty. His mother, Sarah Bird Northrup Ridge, took John R. Ridge to Fayetteville, Arkansas for safety.

In 1843, Ridge was sent to the Great Barrington School in Great Barrington, Massachusetts for two years. After that, he returned to Fayetteville to study law. It was during this period that his first known writing was published. He published a poem, "To a Thunder Cloud," in the Arkansas State Gazette.

After starting a law practice, in 1847, Ridge married Elizabeth Wilson, a white woman. They had one daughter, Alice, in 1848.

=== On the run ===
In 1849, Ridge killed Ross sympathizer David Kell, who he thought had been involved in his father's assassination, over a horse dispute. Despite having a good argument for self-defense, Ridge fled to Missouri to avoid prosecution. The next year, he went west because of the California gold rush, but disliked being a miner. While there, he was rejoined by his wife and daughter.

=== Writing career ===
Ridge published poetry in The Golden Era and other California magazines (these were posthumously collected). He also wrote essays for the Democratic Party.

In California he wrote what is now considered the first Native American novel and the first novel written in California, The Life and Adventures of Joaquin Murieta: The Celebrated California Bandit (1854). Published six years after the Mexican-American War, by which the United States acquired California and other large territories in the Southwest, this fictional version explored the life of a notorious Mexican bandit. He was represented as coming to California to seek his fortune during the Gold Rush. He turns to crime after suffering violence by white men against his wife and brother. This novel condemned American racism, especially toward the recently defeated Mexicans. Although the book was widely popular, Ridge never made money from the book's publication. By the time of his death some 13 years later, it had not yet even turned a profit.

Ridge was a writer and the first editor of the Sacramento Bee. He also wrote for the San Francisco Herald, among other publications. As an editor, he advocated assimilationist policies for American Indians as his father had. He appeared to trust the federal government to protect their treaty rights, but ignored the failures of the government toward the Cherokee and other peoples.

Ridge had elements in his life that contrasted with his anti-racism in writing. He had grown up on a plantation and also owned enslaved African Americans while still living in Arkansas. In addition, he had expressed his belief that California Indians were inferior to those of other tribes.

==== The Life and Adventures of Joaquin Murieta ====
Ridge wrote his novel about a Mexican man, based on a legendary figure who was widely discussed in newspapers of the day. Ridge portrays Joaquin Murieta as a young, innocent and industrious man who is hampered in his attempts to build a life in the United States by the racism of the people. One expression of this was the 1850 Foreign Miner's Tax Law, passed two years after the Mexican-American War, which severely limited the ability of Mexicans to mine for gold. Ridge's portrayal of Murieta is a bandit who attracts numerous associates and terrorizes the state of California for several months with acts of violence. Ridge's Murieta is also portrayed as a romantic figure, often showing kindness (especially to women) and relishing the stories about him. He keeps his identity so secret that he can walk through towns without being recognized.

Although the novel is fictional, many people took it as fact. Some historians cited it when writing biographical materials on Murrieta.

Literary scholars often highlight Ridge’s critique of racialized structures of power in Gold Rush–era California. Often regarding the text, Ridge and several commentators argue that the violence directed at Mexicans in the text operates effectively "under the color of American law," since local authorities frequently ignored or tolerated such acts.

=== Civil War and the Southern Cherokee delegation ===
During the Civil War, Ridge openly supported the "Copperheads", Southern sympathizers. He opposed both the election of Abraham Lincoln and the President's Emancipation Proclamation, blaming the war on abolitionists.

After the war, Ridge was invited by the federal government to head the Southern Cherokee delegation in postwar treaty proceedings. This part of the nation had supported the Confederacy, which had promised the Native Americans in Indian Territory a state of their own if they won the war. Despite his best efforts, the Cherokee region was not admitted as a separate state to the Union.

== Death ==
In December 1866, Ridge returned to his home in Grass Valley, California. He died of "brain fever" (Encephalitis lethargica) on October 5, 1867. He was buried at Greenwood Memorial Park in Grass Valley.

== Bibliography ==
- The Life and Adventures of Joaquin Murieta, the Celebrated California Bandit (San Francisco: W. B. Cooke and Company, 1854) (San Francisco: Fred MacCrellish & Co., 3rd ed., 1871) (Hollister, California: Evening Free Lance, 1927) (Norman: University of Oklahoma Press, 1955) (University of Oklahoma Press, 1969)
- Poems, by a Cherokee Indian, with an Account of the Assassination of His Father, John Ridge (San Francisco: H. Payot, 1868)
- The Lives of Joaquin Murieta and Tiburcio Vasquez; the California Highwaymen (San Francisco: F. MacCrellish & Co., 1874)
- California's Age of Terror: Murieta and Vasquez (Hollister, California: Evening Free Lance, 1927)
- Crimes and Career of Tiburcio Vasquez, the Bandit of San Benito County and Notorious Early California Outlaw (Hollister, California: Evening Free Lance, 1927)
- A Trumpet of Our Own: Yellow Bird's Essays on the North American Indian; Selections From the Writings of the Noted Cherokee Author, John Rollin Ridge (San Francisco : The Book Club of California, 1981). Compiled and edited by David Farmer & Rennard Strickland.

Salomon, Nicolás. "Becoming Joaquín Murieta: John Rollin Ridge and the Making of an Icon." eScholarship, University of California, 2016, https://escholarship.org/uc/item/0dn486ng
