= Jesus Valenzuela =

Jesus Valenzuela, also known as Joaquin Ocomorenia, the alias used by him as a member of the Five Joaquins Gang, born in Pueblo de Murrieta, he was the brother of Joaquin and Teodoro Valenzuela and a cousin of Joaquin Murrieta and his brothers and other Murrieta cousins. He came to California in 1849 with his brothers, Joaquin Murrieta and his brothers and cousins.

Jesus Valenzuela was member of the gang not a leader. After he killed a fellow Mexican in a gold camp he promised his brothers he would return to Sonora but he spent the money they gave him for the trip and stayed in California, running with the band of Tres Dedos. Jesus' nickname Ocho Moreno, dated from his childhood in Pueblo de Murrieta, and was his nickname when he became a member of the Five Joaquins Gang. A garbled form of his alias, Joaquin Ocomorenia became known to the State Legislature and was put on the list of the Five Joaquins.

Jesus took his brother's name as an alias after Joaquin Valenzuela was killed at the Arroyo de Cantua. Under his name Jesus Valenzuela, became an acknowledged associate of Jack Powers and Pio Linares but still called himself Ochomorenia. Under the name Joaquin Valenzuela, Jesus worked on the Rancho San Emidio, living there with his family, but was known by some as a former Murrieta gang member.

In 1858, following the Rancho San Juan Capistrano del Camate murders, robbery and kidnapping, Jesus was identified by a posse, searching the Rancho San Emidio for the Rancho San Juan murderers, as Joaquin Ocomorenia, thought to be the alias of Joaquin Valenzuela. As Joaquin Valenzuela he was arrested, the vigilantes had believed Jesus was Joaquin Valenzuela who they believed went by an alias Joaquin Ocomorenio. Jesus did not attempt to alert them of their mistake and was hung under his brothers name. The vigilantes after a long search, believed Jesus Valenzuela had escaped their punishment for his crimes with the gang of Pio Linares at Rancho San Juan Capistrano del Camate.
