= Five Joaquins Gang =

California outlaw gang (1850–1853)

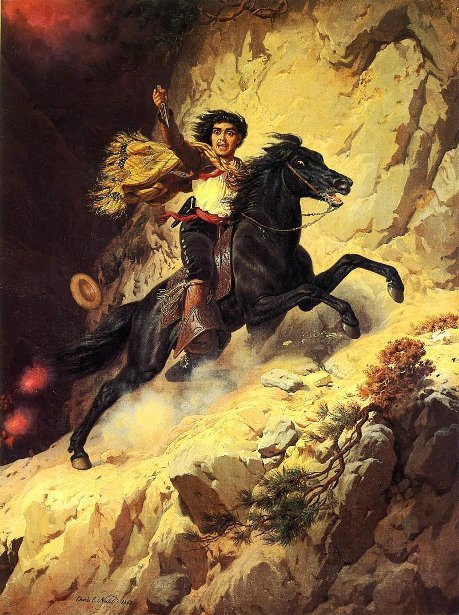
- Joaquín Murrieta, called the "Robin Hood of California", was a notorious outlaw during the California gold rush and a member of the Five Joaquíns.
- Years active: 1850–1853
- Territory: Mother Lode area, Sierra Nevada, USA
- Leaders: Joaquin Murrieta; Joaquin Ocomorenia; Joaquin Carrillo
- Activities: Horse theft, robbery, murder
- Notable members: Joaquin Valenzuela; Joaquin Botellier

The Five Joaquins were a mid-19th-century outlaw gang in California which, according to the state legislature, was led by five men, identified as follows: "... the five Joaquins, whose names are Joaquin Murrieta, Joaquin Ocomorenia, Joaquin Valenzuela, Joaquin Botellier, and Joaquin Carrillo, and their banded associates."

Operating between 1850 and 1853, during the California gold rush, the gang, joined by Murrieta's right-hand man, known as Three Fingered Jack, was reputed to have been responsible for most of the horse theft, robberies, and murders committed in the Mother Lode area of the Sierra Nevada. They were accused of stealing more than $100,000 in gold and over 100 horses, as well as killing at least 19 people, and had outrun three armed posses, killing three lawmen. The gang is believed to have killed as many as 28 Chinese immigrants and 13 Anglo-Americans.

On May 11, 1853, Governor of California John Bigler signed a legislative act creating the "California State Rangers", led by Captain Harry Love (a former Texas Ranger). Their mission was to capture the "Five Joaquins", named above. The California Rangers were paid $150 a month and stood a chance to share a $5,000 reward for the capture of Joaquin Murrieta.

On July 25, 1853, a group of Rangers, led by Captain Love, encountered a band of armed Mexican men near Panoche Pass in San Benito County, 50 miles from Monterey. A confrontation took place, and two of the Mexicans were killed. One was claimed to be Murrieta, and the other was thought to be Three-Fingered Jack. A plaque (California Historical Landmark #344) near the intersection of State Routes 33 and 198 now marks the approximate site of Murrieta's headquarters in Arroyo de Cantua, where he was presumably and officially ruled by the State of California to have been killed. However, that claim was soon disputed and has continued to be. The result of that skirmish was that the gang was broken up, and its activities ended. Some of the members returned to Sonora, although many of the gang's members remained in California, some continuing their criminal careers, many others became vaqueros on California ranches or followed other walks of life.

== Members ==
Of the Joaquins named by the bill of the California state legislature, three were actual leaders in the gang, two others were only members.

- Joaquin Murrieta, a Sonoran, was the head of this group of bandit bands.
- Joaquin Ocomorenia, the alias used by Jesus Valenzuela, was the cousin of Murrieta. Jesus Valenzuela was a member of the gang, not a leader. A garbled form of his alias, Joaquin Ocomorenia became known to the State Legislature and was put on the list of the Five Joaquins.
- Joaquin Valenzuela, Ocomorenia's brother, leader of his own gang, in charge of gathering and organizing the droves of the gang's horses. Additionally he drove them south for the trade in horses from California to Sonora.
- Joaquin Botellier, according to the state of California listed as one of the Five Joaquins, was actually Joaquin Botellas, a Sonoran, who became an active member of Murrieta's personal band of the Gang.
- Joaquin Carrillo, the younger brother of Jesus Carrillo and Murrieta's stepbrother. He operated the Murrieta rancho in Cañada Molina Vallejo with Murrieta's brother-in-law Vincente Jesus Féliz.

== Mass media depictions ==
- The Mask of Zorro (1998) The film features a fictionalized depiction of the encounter between the gang and a Mexican posse led by Captain Harrison Love. Joaquin Murrieta, Three-Fingered Jack and Murrieta's fictional brother Alejandro (Antonio Banderas) are three bandits who are confronted by Captain Love and his posse. Joaquin is killed and Jack is captured, whilst Alejandro escapes. Jack is made to work as a slave laborer and is killed in an act of rebellion while Alejandro later assumes the role of Zorro to kill Love in revenge.
- Behind The Mask of Zorro (2005) a History Channel documentary about Murrieta and his gang, and how he inspired the character of Zorro.
