= Harry Love (lawman) =

California Ranger (1810–1868)

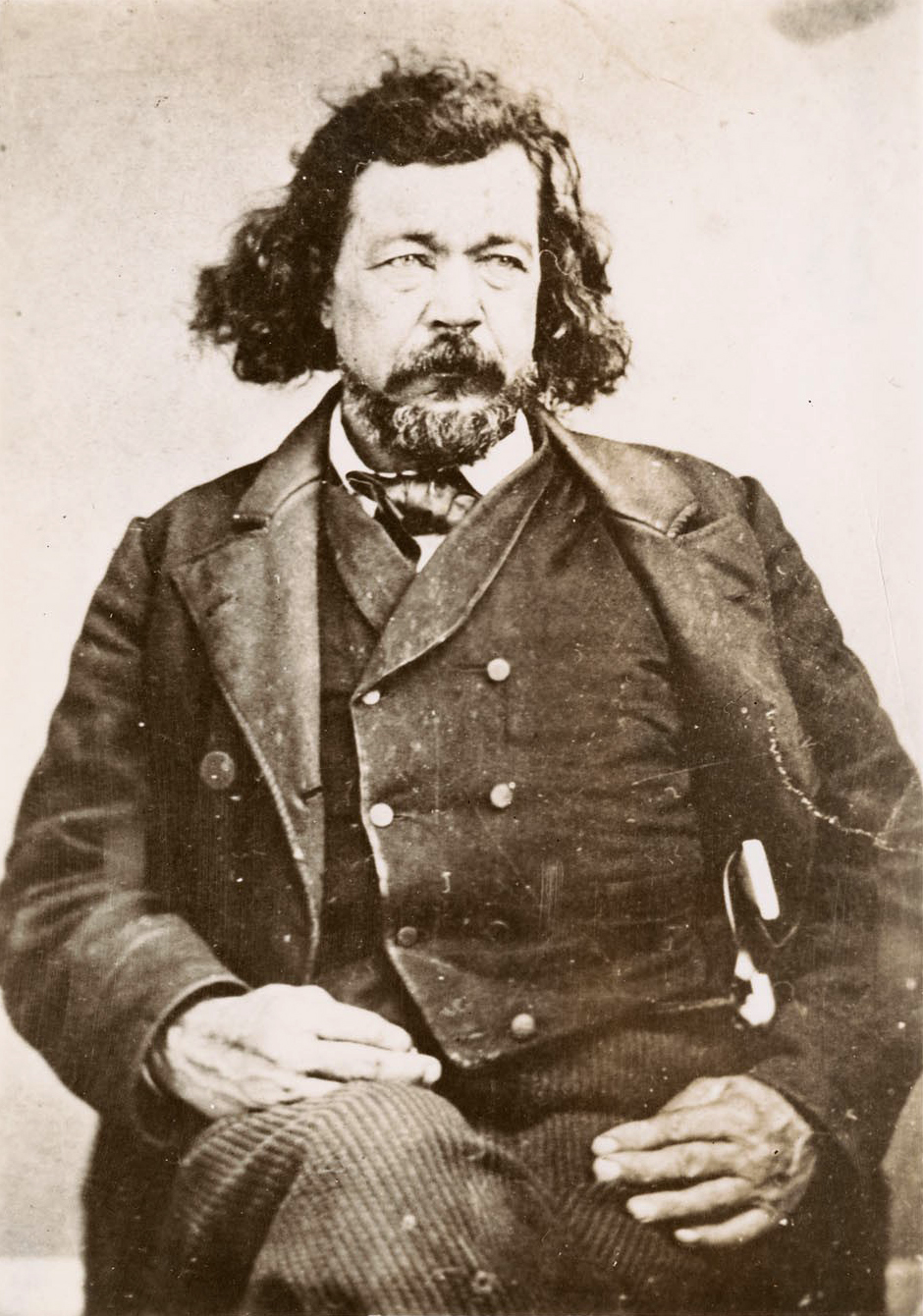
- Daguerreotype of Harry Love taken circa 1850
- Born: 1810; Vermont, U.S.
- Died: June 29, 1868 (aged 57–58); Santa Clara, California, U.S.
- Spouse: Mary Bennett
- Military career
- Allegiance: United States
- Branch: United States Army; California Rangers; CA Army National Guard
- Service years: 1846–1850
- Rank: Captain
- Conflicts: Mexican–American War
- Other work: Lawman

Harry Love (1810 – June 29, 1868) was an American lawman. He served as the head of California's first state-wide law enforcement agency, the California Rangers, and became famous for allegedly killing the notorious bandit Joaquin Murrieta. The California Rangers were also considered to be part of California's early state militia, the predecessor to the current California Army National Guard, with Love holding the rank of Captain within the state.

== Early life and career ==
Love was born in Vermont and left home at an early age to become a sailor. He eventually ended up in Texas and allegedly joined the Texas Rangers. Love fought in the Mexican–American War and was likely mustered into federal service with the U.S. Army with other Texas Rangers in order to fight in the war, following the annexation of the state in 1846. According to limited accounts, he served as a scout, an army express rider, and also led an exploration up the Rio Grande.

== To California and the pursuit of Joaquin Murrieta ==
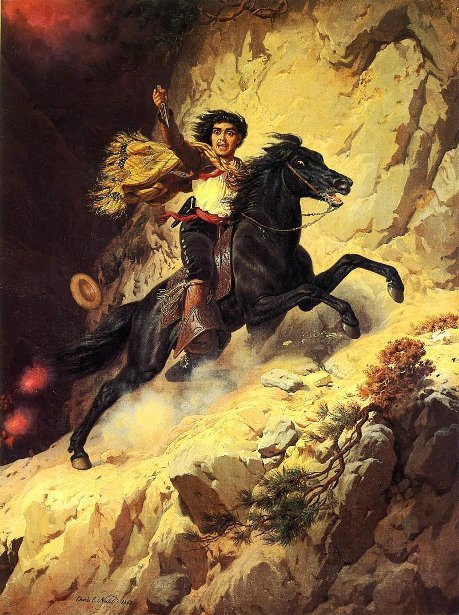
Joaquín Murrieta, called the "Robin Hood of California", was a notorious outlaw during the California Gold Rush.

In 1850 during the California Gold Rush, Love came to California to seek his fortune but was unsuccessful in the mines. Instead, he became a Deputy Sheriff in Santa Barbara, California. Later in 1852, he also worked as a bounty hunter, hunting for three mounted men seen in the area, thought to be the killers of Allen B. Ruddle, an unarmed young man robbed while traveling in a wagon to Stockton. To earn the large reward for the capture of these men, put up by Ruddles family, Love and a partner, tracked the three riders to Rancho San Luis Gonzaga at the foot of Pacheco Pass then one of them with another man to Buenaventura in Santa Barbara County. There in June 1852, they captured the one of two men they had followed, Pedro Gonzalez, later found to be a member of Joaquin Murrieta's gang, who had been accused of murder. However, at the Cuesta del Conejo, Love killed Gonzalez when Gonzalez tried escaping custody during a water stop on the way to Los Angeles.

With his reputation from the war and this success under his belt, Love was named as the commander of the California Rangers. The unit was created on May 11, 1853 by Governor John Bigler specifically to capture or kill the "Five Joaquins" gang, who had been identified as being responsible for over 20 murders, and numerous robberies and horse thefts in California's Gold Country in just the early months of 1853. For two months, the Rangers rode through the region seeking information on Murrieta and the other Joaquins, all while apprehending various other criminals.

However the Five Joaquins seemed to have vanished from the goldfields, so Love tried looking on the far side of the Diablo Range, and near San Juan Bautista he encountered and arrested Joaquin Murrieta's brother in law Jesus Feliz. Love promised Feliz he would be freed if he led Love and his Rangers to Joaquin Murrieta. On July 12 after writing a note to the Governor, Love made a deceptive march southward in the Salinas Valley to throw spies off their track, then at night backtracked and next day moved southeastward along the San Benito valley and into the Diablo Range to the Rancho Real de Los Aguilas. From there they followed La Vereda del Monte to a point overlooking the Arroyo de Cantua, the gang's hideout and headquarters on July 21. There they had gathered hundreds of stolen horses and unbroken mustangs and over 80 men who were getting the horses branded and ready to drive them to Sonora for sale.

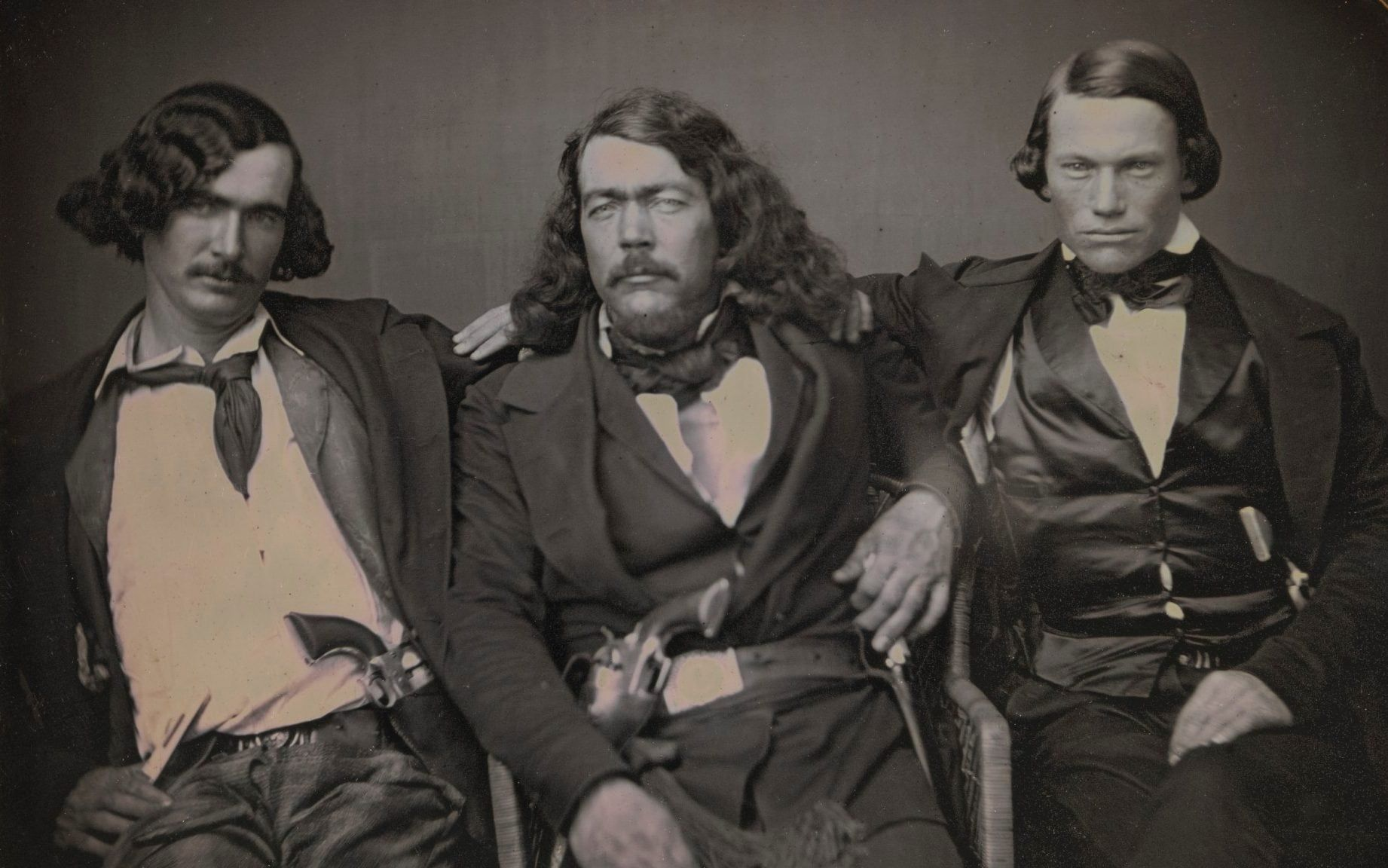
Harry Love - in the middle - with William Henderson -- to his left - and an unidentified California Ranger - thought to be William "Bill" Byrnes - to his right -.

After dismissing Feliz, Love and the Rangers rode down into the valley of the Cantua. There they rode among these "mesteñeros" and picked out seven or eight horses with brands by which they recognized them as stolen, then told them that they would be returning to San Juan and rode back ten miles, intending to observe these men. On the 24th the Rangers returned to find the camp deserted, they then moved three miles down the valley and hid themselves until 2 AM when they saddled up and rode down the valley to the southeast.

On morning of July 25, 1853, Love and 20 of the Rangers encountered a small group of men south of Panoche Pass at the point where Arroyo de Cantua, emerged from the foothills, in Mariposa County, (in what is now Fresno County), about 100 miles (160 km) away from the Mother Lode and 88 miles (141 km) away from Monterey. A confrontation occurred and four of the men were killed, two captured and three escaped. It was claimed by the Rangers that one of the dead men was Murrieta and another, Manuel Garcia (who the Rangers dubbed "Three-Fingered Jack"), Murrieta's right-hand man. The Rangers cut off the heads of both men as well as Garcia's hand as proof, sending them by fast riders ahead of the main force to Fort Miller. Murrieta's head and the hand were preserved in brandy, but Garcia's head, shot through with a bullet decayed too rapidly in the summer heat, forcing them to bury it at Fort Miller, near Millerton.

The jars were displayed in Mariposa, Stockton and San Francisco and traveled throughout California, where spectators could, for $1, see the remains. Seventeen people, including a priest, signed affidavits identifying the remains as Murrieta's and Love and his Rangers received the reward money. However, a young woman claiming to be Murrieta's sister said she did not recognize the head and argued that it could not be his since it did not have a characteristic scar on it. Additionally, numerous sightings of Murrieta were reported after his reported death. Many people criticized Love for showing the remains in large cities far from the mining camps, where Joaquin might have been recognized. It has even been claimed that Love and his Rangers killed some innocent men and made up the story of the capture of Murrieta to claim the reward money. Doubts about Murrieta's capture followed Love for the rest of his life. The head and hand were eventually lost in the 1906 San Francisco earthquake.

== Later life ==
Having accomplished its mission, the California Rangers were disbanded and Love purchased a large tract of land near Boulder Creek, California, in Santa Cruz County, along the creek that bears his name today. In 1854 he married his neighbor, the widow Mary Bennett. Mary had also lost a son, killed in a gunfight by a son of Isaac Graham, a pioneer of that area. Love's marriage to Mary Bennett was rough and she soon moved away to Santa Clara. They reconciled and separated several times until 1866, when she sued for divorce, but lost.

However, by the following year, fires, floods, and squatters had destroyed Love's property, leaving him homeless and in debt. He moved to his wife's ranch and lived in a house that she had built for him. She never let him live with her, however, and he plotted to kill her bodyguard, who was ordered to keep him from seeing her.

On June 30, 1868, Love showed up on the porch of his wife's house in Santa Clara, where he was not allowed. When Mary and the bodyguard arrived, a gunfight broke out and Love was shot in the arm. Doctors attempted to save his life by amputating his arm, but he still died.

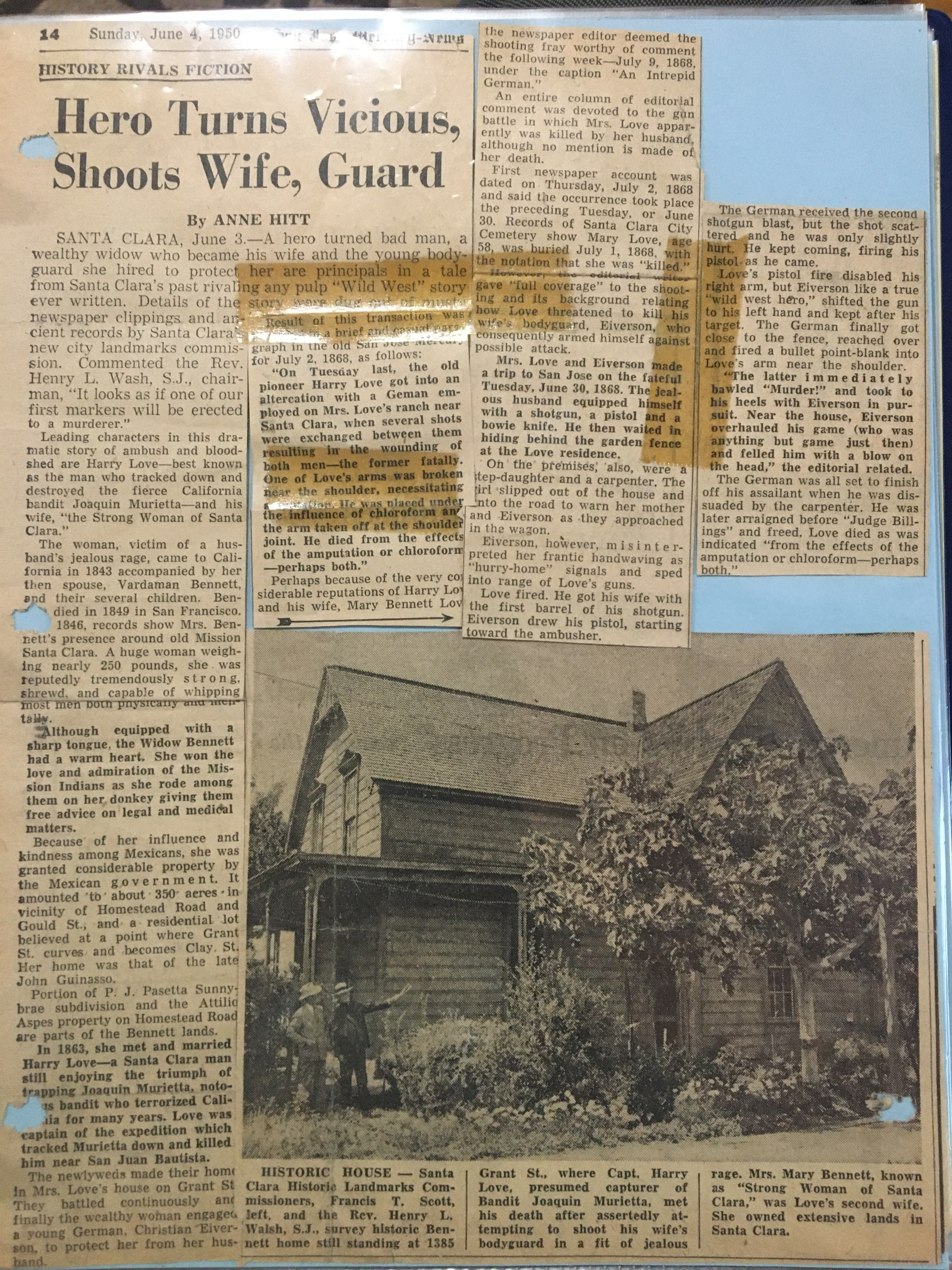
A San Jose Mercury article detailing the shootout between Love and Christian Iverson (Mary's bodyguard)

Love was buried in an unmarked grave in what is now Mission City Memorial Park in Santa Clara. In 2003 members of E Clampus Vitus laid a headstone for him.

== Headstone ==
Harry Love's monument is located at the Mission City Memorial Park, 420 N Winchester Blvd., Santa Clara, CA 95050

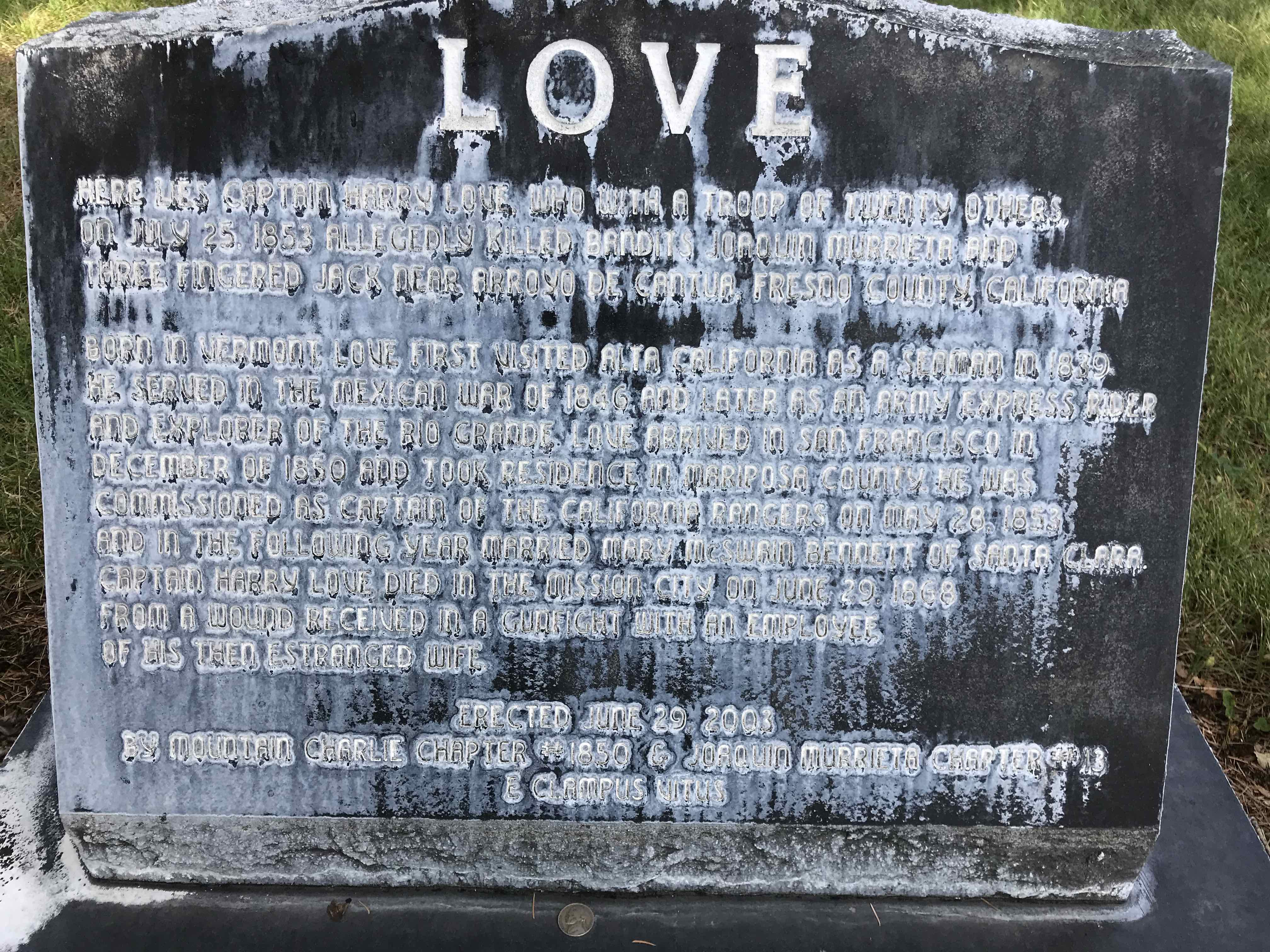
Discolored headstone of Harry Love (2019)

The epitaph reads:

HERE LIES CAPTAIN HARRY LOVE, WHO WITH A TROOP OF TWENTY OTHERS,
ON JULY 25, 1853 ALLEGEDLY KILLED BANDITS JOAQUIN MURRIETTA AND
THREE FINGERED JACK NEAR ARROYO DE CANTUA, FRESNO COUNTY, CALIFORNIA.

BORN IN VERMONT, LOVE FIRST VISITED ALTA CALIFORNIA AS A SEAMAN IN 1839.
HE SERVED IN THE MEXICAN WAR OF 1846 AND LATER AS AN ARMY EXPRESS RIDER
AND EXPLORER OF THE RIO GRANDE. LOVE ARRIVED IN SAN FRANCISCO IN
DECEMBER OF 1850 AND TOOK RESIDENCE IN MARIPOSA COUNTY. HE WAS
COMMISSIONED AS CAPTAIN OF THE CALIFORNIA RANGERS ON MAY 28, 1853
AND IN THE FOLLOWING YEAR MARRIED MARY McSWAIN BENNETT OF SANTA CLARA.
CAPTAIN HARRY LOVE DIED IN THE MISSION CITY ON JUNE 29, 1868
FROM A WOUND RECEIVED IN A GUNFIGHT WITH AN EMPLOYEE
OF HIS THEN ESTRANGED WIFE.

ERECTED JUNE 29, 2003
BY MOUNTAIN CHARLIE CHAPTER #1850 & JOAQUIN MURRIETA CHAPTER #13,
E CLAMPUS VITUS.

== In popular culture ==
The 1998 film The Mask of Zorro depicts a fictionalized account of Love's capture of the Murrieta gang. Here a character named Harrison Love (Matt Letscher), who serves as the secondary antagonist of the film, leads a party of California State Rangers who shoot down two notorious bandits Joaquin Murrieta (who is killed) and "Three-Fingered Jack" (who survives, but is killed later). In the film, after Joaquin's death, his (fictional) brother, Alejandro (Antonio Banderas), becomes the new Zorro and later kills Captain Love in revenge. As he did in the movie, the actual Harry Love preserved Murrieta's head and Jack's hand in large, alcohol-filled glass jars.

In the Fire Country episode "No Way Out," a group of escaped inmates are after a stolen 1836 Colt Patterson revolver that once belonged to Love and is worth $1.5 million.
