= Casanate =

Village in Sonora, Mexico

Coordinates: 26°36′35″N 108°46′35″W

Casanate, is a village in Álamos Municipality in the Mexican state of Sonora, in northwestern Mexico. It is 48.5 kilometers south southeast of Álamos and 26.7 kilometers Northwest of El Fuerte, in Sinaloa. It lies on the left bank of the Rio Cuchujaqui at an elevation of 140 meters. Its population at the time of its last census was 69 persons, 37 males and 32 females.

== History ==
Casanate, was the location of the hacienda Tapizuelas built by the Spanish Colonel of Militias, of Real de Los Alamos, Don Francisco Julian De Alvarado after he acquired the rancho on July 1, 1748. It was one of the stops located along the route of El Camino Real through Sinaloa and Sonora between El Fuerte, Sinaloa and Álamos, Sonora.
