= California Rangers =

Former statewide law enforcement agency in California

Agency overview
- Formed: May 17, 1853
- Dissolved: August 29, 1853
- Employees: 20

Jurisdictional structure
- Operations jurisdiction: USA
- Legal jurisdiction: California
- General nature: Military police; Civilian police

Operational structure
- Headquarters: Quartzburg, Mariposa County, California (initial recruitment)
- Sworn members: 20
- Agency executive: Harry S. Love, Captain
- Parent agency: State of California

Notables
- Person: Joaquin Murrieta, Criminal, for Target
- Significant Law enforcement, apprehension of criminals: Five Joaquins Gang

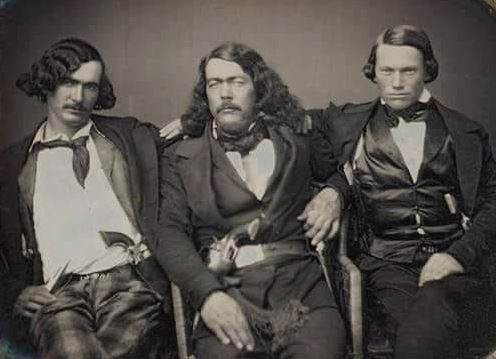
The California Rangers in 1853. From left to right: Lafayette Black, Capt. Harry Love, and Billy Henderson.

The California Rangers was a paramilitary state police force in California, United States, established in May 1853 and disestablished in August of the same year. It was the first statewide law enforcement agency in California. It was founded by Governor of California John Bigler and commanded by Harry Love specifically to combat violent crime in the Gold Country at the time, particularly the Five Joaquins Gang, which they were responsible for defeating.

The California Rangers were considered part of California's state militia, which eventually became the modern California Army National Guard. They can be considered the precursor of the modern California Highway Patrol and the former California State Police, as well as the State Fugitive Teams of the California Department of Corrections and Rehabilitation, the Special Agents of the California Department of Justice, and the California Bureau of Investigation.

== History ==
After years of robbery and killing in California's Gold Country, the "Five Joaquins" gang, led by Mexican outlaw Joaquin Murrieta, had been identified as being responsible for more than twenty murders. Citizens of the state petitioned Governor of California John Bigler to organize a military company to capture them. The California State Rangers was created on May 17, 1853 by an act of the California State Legislature, and signed into law by Governor Bigler. Appointed Captain Harry S. Love was authorized to raise a Ranger Company of 20 men to kill or capture Murrieta and his gang and recover any stolen property found.

On May 28, 1853, Captain Love raised his company of experienced Mexican War veterans, including Lieutenant Patrick Edward Connor and Capt. W. J. Howard, in Quartzburg, Mariposa County. Love and his Rangers captured many minor outlaws and horse thieves during the next two months of searching but found no trace of the Five Joaquins. However, on July 12, 1853, they captured Jesus, a brother-in-law of the bandit, who promised to lead them to the Joaquins' hideout if they would let him go.

On July 25, 1853, the State Rangers encountered Murrieta and part of his band at a spring on the Arroyo Cantua near the Coast Ranges on the Tulare plains. Joaquin and his men tried to escape on horseback, but in the pursuit the Rangers killed Murrieta and his accomplice "Three Finger Jack", and two others. They also took two prisoners, one of whom was drowned crossing Tulare Slough in Tulare County during their return. The other was turned over to civil authority of Mariposa County for trial. Later Love displayed Murrieta’s head and Jack’s hand for public viewing.

After the California State Rangers's mission was accomplished with the suppression of the Five Joaquins, the agency was disbanded on August 29, 1853. Governor Bigler paid Captain Love $1,000 in reward money, but the State Legislature decided that the members of the State Rangers had not been sufficiently rewarded, and voted to pay them an additional $5,000.

== Legacy ==
As the first state police force, the California State Rangers were the precursors of the later state police organizations. The California State Capitol Police was created in 1887, local to Sacramento. The Capitol Police later became the California State Police, a division under the General Services Administration. In 1995, this merged with the California Highway Patrol, which conducts traffic enforcement on freeways, to become the proper state police force of California.

Regarding criminals already convicted in court, in 1996, the State Legislature enacted special funds to create the State Fugitive Teams under the California Department of Corrections and Rehabilitation to investigate and apprehend the most dangerous fugitives in the state. In 2005, the department created a new division, the Office of Correctional Safety, with the Law Enforcement and Investigations Unit to oversee fugitive and gang investigations.

Although no longer called "Rangers", many of the roles and responsibilities of the former California Rangers are continued with the Special Agents working in the current California Department of Justice, California Department of Corrections and Rehabilitation and the California Bureau of Investigation, which operate teams across the state providing investigative expertise, task forces, and other resources to law enforcement agencies.

== See also ==
- California Department of Justice Special Agents – Modern counterpart to the historic Rangers
- List of law enforcement agencies in California
- Texas Rangers
- Arizona Rangers
- Colorado Mounted Rangers
- New Mexico Mounted Patrol
- Navajo Rangers
- Park ranger
