= The Mark of Zorro =

The Mark of Zorro may refer to:

- The distinctive mark left by the fictional character Zorro
- The Curse of Capistrano, a 1919 novel by Johnston McCulley that was re-published as The Mark of Zorro in 1924
- The Mark of Zorro (1920 film), a silent film starring Douglas Fairbanks
- The Mark of Zorro (1940 film), a film starring Tyrone Power
- The Mark of Zorro (1974 film), a television movie starring Frank Langella
- The Mark of Zorro (La marque de Zorro), a 1975 French film starring Clint Douglas; see Zorro § Theatrical films and film serials
- Mark of Zorro (1975 film), a 1975 Italian film starring George Hilton
- The Mark of Zorro, a 1997 radio drama produced by BBC; see Zorro § Audio/radio dramas
- The Mark of Zorro, a 2011 radio drama produced by Hollywood Theater of the Ear for Blackstone Audio; see Zorro § Audio/radio dramas

== See also ==
- The Mask of Zorro, a 1998 film starring Anthony Hopkins and Antonio Banderas
