= Zorro (musical) =

- 2008 production poster
- Music: Gipsy Kings; John Cameron
- Lyrics: Stephen Clark
- Book: Stephen Clark; Helen Edmundson
- Basis: Zorro: A Novel by Isabel Allende
- Productions: 2008 UK tour; 2008 West End; 2011 International tour; 2022 London

Zorro is a musical with music by the Gipsy Kings and John Cameron, a book by Stephen Clark and Helen Edmundson, and lyrics by Stephen Clark. It is inspired by the 2005 fictional biography of the same name by Isabel Allende, itself a prequel to the 1919 serialized novella The Curse of Capistrano by Johnston McCulley, the first work to feature the pulp hero Zorro. It also contains numerous references to earlier Zorro-related works, especially the 1998 film The Mask of Zorro.

The show had its world premiere in 2008 at the Congress Theatre in Eastbourne, as part of a UK trial tour, followed by a London West End run at the Garrick Theatre. Zorro began previews at the Garrick Theatre on July 2, 2008, after the first few were cancelled due to technical problems, with an official opening on July 15, 2008. Christopher Renshaw directed and Rafael Amargo choreographed. The cast featured Matt Rawle as Diego de la Vega, Emma Williams as Luisa, Adam Levy as Ramon, Lesli Margherita as Inez (who won an Olivier Award for her role), Nick Cavaliere as Sergeant Garcia, and Jonathan Newth as Don Alejandro. On December 17, 2008, the cast of Zorro performed a medley of songs from the show on the Royal Variety Performance at the London Palladium. An original cast recording was released in February 2009. The production ran for almost nine months, playing its final performance on March 14, 2009.

A one-night concert version was performed on February 23, 2020 at Cadogan Hall in London. The cast was led by two of the original cast members, Lesli Margherita and Emma Williams. This production had new compositions, orchestrations and arrangements by John Cameron. There was no set; however, the actors used additional props and costumes. George Reeve designed and created the video projections.

Aria Entertainment revived the show at the Hope Mills Theatre in Manchester in March 2020, but the run was cut short after just two performances due to the COVID-19 pandemic. The show was transferred to London in 2022, but its scheduled reopening on March 12 was again delayed. The show reopened at the Charing Cross Theatre on April 12, 2022, running until May 28.

== Synopsis ==
Zorro at The Garrick Theatre

=== Prologue ===
Deep inside a cave, a band of gypsies stop to rest for the night, while dancing and singing, they listen eagerly as their leader tells them about an old gypsy myth - the infamous story of the legendary hero, Zorro.

=== Act I ===
Don Diego de la Vega, a wealthy young caballero, is sent away from his California home by his father, Don Alejandro, to school in Spain. He is forced to leave his childhood love Luisa, who is also being sent away by Diego's father. At the same time, Don Alejandro announces that Diego and Luisa's childhood friend Ramon shall become captain of the army, which pleases both Diego and Luisa.

Later, in Spain, Diego has run away from school and joined a band of gypsies who perform in the backstreets of the city ("Baila Me"). He is their star attraction, and after showing several tricks to an enthralled audience, he sees Luisa. Luisa persuades Diego to return to California to stop Ramon, who has become a tyrant. Inez, another gypsy and evidently Diego's lover, is not pleased to see Luisa and decides that she and all the other gypsies must accompany them. In California, Diego finds that Ramon has stripped the people of their rights and has put himself in charge ever since Don Alejandro "died." However, unbeknownst to everyone, Don Alejandro is not dead and is being held captive by Ramon. Ramon demonstrates his cruelty by sentencing three men to death for stealing; the men had added rocks to their sacks of grain to gain extra money for their hungry families. As the men are taken away, their women angrily declare their hatred of Ramon and his treatment of the people ("Libertad").

After witnessing the cruelty of his old friend, and with the help of Inez (the only one who knows his plans), Diego adopts a heroic alter ego, which the people name "El Zorro" (though Diego wanted to be called "El Puma" instead), to defend the people of the pueblo ("Hope"). At the same time, to keep his identity secret, he presents himself to Ramon as an idiot of no real threat. He offers himself to Ramon as a personal servant, a move that angers Luisa, who believes that she brought Diego back for nothing.

The following day, the three men prepare to be hanged. As they are led to the gallows, Luisa and the women of the pueblo lament over the way the pueblo used to be and express hope that things will get better ("In One Day"). Before the noose can be tightened, Zorro makes a name for himself by saving the prisoners. Zorro swings in spectacularly out of nowhere and manages to appear almost simultaneously as Zorro and Diego, so that no one will suspect Diego.

After another spectacular rescue, Zorro flees from Ramon's guards and find himself in Luisa's room, having walked in on her while she is in the bath. Embarrassed, he lets it slip that he knows her name, but his identity is kept safe from her, and she begins to fall in love with Zorro, just as Diego has always been in love with her ("Falling").

Meanwhile, the gypsies cause a stir in the pueblo by drinking and dancing together ("Bamboleo/There's a Tale"), enticing Ramon's cowardly but warm-hearted second-in-command Sergeant Garcia. Flirting and joking with Garcia, Inez soon finds a new admirer, and Garcia tries his best to act strong and brave like Zorro. However, Inez still has eyes for Diego and finds Garcia merely entertaining. Ramon, initially intrigued by the idea of free wine, eventually turns against the gypsies and their radical ways and tries to prevent their activities. He finally attempts to exert his power by forcing himself upon Luisa, the woman he lusts after but who hates everything that he has become. Zorro appears just in time to save Luisa and tricks Ramon into accidentally admitting that Don Alejandro is still alive. To show that he will always be watching him, Zorro forces Ramon to his knees and carves his signature "Z" into Ramon's chest, as Ramon screams in agony and anger.

=== Act II ===
The second act opens with the band of gypsies from the prologue reappearing on stage and performing a large song and dance routine. ("Entrada")

When the storyline continues, Ramon reveals the full extent of his injury: he is permanently scarred with the mark of Zorro. The gypsies and citizens mock him, and he angrily declares a curfew and that anyone out after the curfew will be shot. The crowd protests ("Freedom"). Inez tells Luisa that it is too dangerous for her to stay in Los Angeles; Luisa says that she knows a place where Ramon can never find her. Ramon orders the guards to shoot into the crowd. The people flee, leaving Inez and Ramon alone. She tells Ramon that his empire is crumbling around him and that soon his greed will consume him ("Bamboleo (Reprise)"). Ramon leaves in denial, but her words have a great effect on him.

Diego tries to advise Garcia on how to express his love for Inez, but when she arrives, Garcia becomes embarrassed and runs off. Diego enquires about Luisa's whereabouts. Inez tells him and also admits that she understands that Diego loves Luisa. Diego, dressed as Zorro, finds the cave where Luisa is hiding. Luisa confesses her feelings to Zorro, and the two dance outside the cave together ("Serenade"). The dance ends with Diego kissing Luisa but then pulling away. Luisa asks him why he's so afraid of his feelings; outside the cave, Diego sadly confesses that he wants to be with Luisa but is afraid that he risks putting her life in danger ("A Love We'll Never Live").

The following day, Garcia tries to impress Inez ("One More Beer"). Ramon, still distressed by Inez's words, goes to confession; he soon notices the priest is actually Zorro, who is trying to find out where Ramon is keeping Don Alejandro. Ramon sets a trap for Zorro, but Zorro manages to escape. Luisa goes to the gypsy camp where Inez transforms her into a gypsy ("Djobi Djoba"). Ramon bursts in and arrests Luisa. Inez calls Garcia a coward because he does nothing to stop Ramon.

Luisa is about to be executed by a firing squad when Zorro, accompanied by several other men dressed as Zorro, fights off the guards. Ramon puts a knife to Inez's throat and tries to make Zorro choose between Luisa and Inez, but Inez throws Ramon to the ground. She tells Ramon that the love between Zorro and Luisa is a love that he can never know. Ramon produces a pistol from his pocket and fatally shoots Inez. After she dies in his arms, a heartbroken Zorro surrenders and is dragged away by the guards as Ramon forces Luisa to agree to marry him. As Ramon leaves with Luisa, the gypsies discover Inez's body and mournfully carry her away.

In his prison cell, Diego laments his failure to protect the people and blames himself for the suffering of the ones he loves ("Hope (Reprise)"). Garcia arrives and, admitting his cowardice, tells Zorro that he can take him to Don Alejandro. Meanwhile, Luisa is dressed by attendants for her wedding to Ramon. She wishes that she could have known the true identity of Zorro ("The Man Behind the Mask") and laments that in order to protect her love, she must sacrifice it as well as her happiness.

As the wedding begins, Zorro arrives, but this Zorro is revealed to be Don Alejandro, who confronts Ramon about his cruelty. An emboldened Garcia and the other guards turn against Ramon, charging him with murdering Inez. Don Alejandro orders Ramon to be arrested, but Ramon says that he will kill Luisa if they try. The wedding proceeds, but just before Luisa gives her vows, the real Zorro swings into the chapel. During the ensuing sword fight with Ramon, Zorro reveals his true identity to Ramon and asks him to stop fighting, saying that they are brothers. Ramon appears to agree, but then draws a small knife and charges at him. Diego evades the blade and causes Ramon to fall on his own knife. Ramon is fatally wounded and dies with his final thoughts being him, Diego, and Luisa as children.

Diego is distressed by what he has done, when Luisa and Don Alejandro reenter the room. Luisa, seeing that Zorro is unmasked, begs him to show her his face. Reluctantly he does so, and Luisa is shocked by the discovery that Zorro is Diego, but still declares that she loves him. The two kiss and embrace. All rejoice ("Fiesta").

== Musical numbers ==
Act I

- "Flamenco Opening" – Gypsies
- "Baila Me" – Diego, Inez and Gypsies
- "Libertad" – Women of the Pueblo
- "Hope" – Diego
- "In One Day" – Luisa and the Women of the Pueblo
- "Falling" – Luisa
- "Bamboleo" / "There's a Tale" – Inez and Gypsies

Act II

- "Entrada" – Gypsies
- "Freedom" – Inez, Citizens and Gypsies
- "Bamboleo" (Reprise) – Inez
- "Serenade" – Instrumental (The dance between Diego and Luisa)
- "A Love We'll Never Live" – Diego and Luisa
- "One More Beer" – Garcia, Inez and the Women of the Pueblo
- "Djobi Djobi" – Inez and Luisa
- "Hope" (Reprise) – Diego
- "Man Behind the Mask" – Luisa
- "Fiesta" – All

== Principal characters ==
- Diego de la Vega / Zorro. He is the son of Don Alejandro, who initially heads the pueblo. He adopts a heroic alter ego to save the people of the pueblo who are being punished under Ramon's cruel leadership.
- Luisa. Luisa grows up with Diego and Ramon. She falls in love first with Diego and then Zorro, not knowing his true identity.
- Ramon. Diego's childhood friend. Ramon is jealous of the feelings Luisa has for Diego. He is made captain of the army and seizes power.
- Inez. The gypsy queen, Inez travels around the backstreets of Barcelona performing with Diego, with whom she falls in love.
- Sergeant Garcia. Military servant to Ramon. He is cowardly, but likable. He falls in love with Inez. He is based on the comic antagonistic character from Disney's 1950s live action television series.
- Don Alejandro. He is Diego's father, and the rightful leader of the Pueblo.

== Original casts ==
Character	UK tour	West End	London
Character	2008		2022
Diego de la Vega / Zorro	Matt Rawle	Matt Rawle	Benjamin Purkiss
Luisa	Aimie Atkinson	Emma Williams	Paige Fenlon
Ramon	Adam Cooper	Adam Levy	Alex Gibson-Giorgio
Inez	Lesli Margherita	Lesli Margherita	Phoebe Panaretos
Sergeant Garcia	Nick Cavaliere	Nick Cavaliere	Marc Pickering
Don Alejandro	Earl Carpenter	Jonathan Newth	Pete Ashmore

== Critical reception ==
Zorro opened at the Garrick Theatre in London to almost entirely favourable reviews. The Flamenco-based score and choreography were especially praised, as were the fight scenes. Michael Billington of the Guardian wrote, "The show may not be high art but it's great fun and brings a refreshingly different, Hispanic sound to the jaded world of West End musicals." He also noted, “The show is popular theatre that actually delivers the goods.” Michael Coveney of What's On Stage wrote, “An onstage flamenco fiesta that sets feet tapping and blood racing round the stalls.” Charles Spencer of The Daily Telegraph referred to Zorro as, “An insanely enjoyable musical.”

In its preview, the Evening Standard stated that whether the show becomes a hit or flop, "an eclectic combination of talents and influences will make Zorro the musical memorable." The play extended its contract into 2009.

== International productions ==
Zorro has been performed in countries such as Austria, Brazil, Bulgaria, China, Czech Republic, France, Germany, Israel, Italy, Japan, Lebanon, Netherlands, Poland, Russia, South Korea, United Kingdom, and United States, and has been translated into multiple languages.

An English-language international tour kicked off on October 28, 2011 at the Oriental Art Center in Shanghai, starring Cooper Grodin as Diego de la Vega and original cast member Lesli Margherita as Inez.

The first US regional production ran from February 15 to April 11, 2012, 2012 at the Hale Centre Theatre in Sandy, Utah. Following its eight-week engagement in Utah, the production played at the Alliance Theatre in Atlanta, Georgia. A 90-week national tour, including a limited Broadway run, was announced but ultimately cancelled.

== Awards and nominations ==
=== Original London production ===
Year	Award	Category	Nominee	Result
2009	Laurence Olivier Award	Best New Musical		Nominated
2009	Laurence Olivier Award	Best Actor in a Musical	Matt Rawle	Nominated
2009	Laurence Olivier Award	Best Actress in a Musical	Emma Williams	Nominated
2009	Laurence Olivier Award	Best Performance in a Supporting Role in a Musical	Lesli Margherita	Won
2009	Laurence Olivier Award	Best Theatre Choreographer	Rafael Amargo	Nominated

== Recording chart positions ==
Chart (2009)	Peak position
French Albums (SNEP)	163
