= Tornado (horse) =

Horse ridden by Zorro

Tornado (occasionally Toronado) is a horse ridden by the character Zorro in several films and books. Tornado is said to be intelligent and fast. His name is pronounced in the Spanish way, "tor-NAH-do" (except in the 1998 movie The Mask of Zorro). Being as jet-black as Zorro's costume enables both the horse and rider to more easily elude capture at night.

== Background ==
Over the decades and the many stories, the specific details of Tornado's history and personality differ considerably.

In Disney's 1950s TV series, Tornado is a fast, strong and smart horse, who can be summoned with a whistle, able to obey verbal and non verbal commands to bring something, like keys to a jail cell, or to do some task. In the second season episodes that take place in Monterey, he is replaced by an equally fast and strong white horse named Phantom, the former steed of a murdered Army lieutenant. Phantom seems to have his own grudge against the same outlaws that Zorro is fighting, due to their having murdered his former owner.

In The Family Channel's 1990s TV series, after Diego/Zorro's first exploit (freeing his father and Victoria Escalante from jail), he decides that he needs a fast horse that nobody in the area has ever seen. He and Felipe (the "Bernardo" character for this series) come across the yet-unnamed black horse and give chase. In a small valley, they came across the horse protecting his sick foal. Diego tends the foal and persuades the horse to accompany him and Felipe back to Zorro's lair. There, Felipe comes up with the name "Toronado" because of the horse's strength and speed, and Toronado seems to like the name. In the series, Toronado displays considerable intelligence and initiative, such as freeing and chasing away the troopers' horses, or leading Felipe to help Zorro when Zorro has been injured or incapacitated.

In Sony's film The Mask of Zorro (1998), when Diego returns to his home after being imprisoned for twenty years, he finds that everything, including the original Tornado is gone. (The novelization states that Tornado probably stayed in the area for as long as possible for love of his master before wandering away.) His successor, Alejandro Murrieta, finds his own horse which he names Tornado after the first horse, and the novelization suggests that it may be the son of the earlier Tornado. It is an intelligent animal, but was at first poorly disciplined and seemed to deliberately make life difficult for his would-be master. For example, when Zorro prepared to jump from a building onto his horse's back, Tornado walked a few steps forward, so his master fell on the streets when he jumped. The second Tornado is referred to as a black Andalusian, although a Friesian plays the role.

In the film's sequel, The Legend of Zorro (2005), Tornado changes from obeying to disobeying Alejandro at various times, explained in the film as the horse's inability to correctly interpret English commands. The horse in The Legend of Zorro was actually a Friesian horse, named Ariaan and was chosen because he wasn't very big. ("Antonio Banderas, who plays Zorro, isn't a very tall man. If he had to ride a big horse he would have looked tiny on the silver screen"). Another horse, the Friesian gelding Tonka, was used in the film as a backup in some galloping scenes and when Ariaan, a stallion, didn't want to cooperate.

In Isabel Allende's novel Zorro (2005), Tornado is given to Don Diego de la Vega upon his return to California, by his milk brother, Bernardo (manservant in the Disney television series), and Bernardo's wife, Light-in-the-night, who trained it. During Bernardo and Diego's Indian initiation ritual before leaving for Spain, Bernardo notices a black foal tentatively following him while he is alone in the woods. Gradually, he befriends the horse, and names him Tornado (pending the horse's approval). He plans to tame Tornado and give him to Diego, but when he wakes up after three days the horse is gone (only to show up again later). Instead of a gift, he takes it as a sign that the horse is his spirit guide, and plans to "develop the horse's virtues: loyalty, strength, and endurance" (76).

A cave that was a filming location for a number of Zorro productions filmed on the old Iverson Movie Ranch in Chatsworth, Calif., has become known as Tornado's Cave, named after Zorro's horse. It appears in other productions as well, such as the 1942 Republic serial Perils of Nyoka. At one end of the cave once stood a fake mine entrance, now known as Tornado's Mine, with pieces of the old film construction still visible.

== See also ==
- List of fictional horses
