= Lesli Margherita =

American stage and screen actress

- Occupation: Actress
- Website: Official website

Lesli Margherita is an American stage and screen actress. She is best known for originating the roles of Inez in the musical Zorro, for which she won a Laurence Olivier Award (for Best Supporting Role in a Musical), and Mrs. Wormwood in the Broadway cast of Matilda the Musical.

== Early life and education ==
Margherita graduated from the University of California, Los Angeles.

== Career ==
=== Film and television ===
Margherita's film credits include Boogeyman 2, Lucky Stiff, Cinderella III: A Twist in Time, and Opening Night.

Upon graduation she appeared in the TV show Fame L.A.. Her television credits include NYPD Blue, Charmed, The District, On the Lot, The Suite Life on Deck, Major Crimes and Donny!.

=== Theatre ===
Margherita became involved with the musical Zorro through a workshop in 2006, which she initially turned down, in Los Angeles, California. She remained with the production through to the West End premiere in June 2008, and garnered critical acclaim for her performance as Inez. In 2009, she won the Laurence Olivier Award for Best Performance in a Supporting Role in a Musical and received a WhatsOnStage Award nomination. Margherita performed a number from the show at the 2008 Royal Variety Performance, and can be heard on the original London cast recording. In 2020, she reprised her performance for a one-night concert version in London.

She appeared as Mrs. Wormwood in the Broadway production of Matilda the Musical, from March 2013 to September 2015 and again starting in September 2016.

She played the role of Mona Kent in the Broadway premiere of Dames at Sea which opened in October 2015. The USA Today review noted, "the actress plays the tyrannical vamp with infectious relish."

She appeared as Cindy Lou Who in the Off-Broadway one person Who's Holiday! in November and December 2017. She was nominated for the 2018 Drama Desk Award, Outstanding Solo Performance; 2018 Lucille Lortel Award, Outstanding Solo Show; and the 2018 Off Broadway Alliance Award, Best Solo Performance.

In regional theatre, Margherita appeared in Spamalot at the Sacramento Music Circus as The Lady of the Lake in 2010. She appeared as Audrey in Little Shop of Horrors at La Mirada Theatre in La Mirada, California, from April to May 2011. From July to September 2011, she appeared at the Goodspeed Opera House in East Haddam, Connecticut, in Show Boat as Julie. She appeared in the new musical The Flamingo Kid at the Hartford Stage in Connecticut from May to June 2019. The Variety reviewer wrote, "Also standing out is Lesli Margherita as Phyllis, Phil’s long-suffering snob of a wife, who gets every laugh effortlessly with her deadpan delivery. She also nails her second act number, a good song with a terrible title".

From January 19, 2020, to March 11, 2020, Lesli starred as Princess in the musical Emojiland at the Duke on 42nd Street theater in New York City.

Lesli most recently appeared on Broadway in the 2024 Broadway revival of Gypsy as Tessie Tura, the burlesque ballerina.

=== Concerts ===
Margherita performed her concert/cabaret act at The Green Room 42 in New York City in December 2018.

== Filmography ==
=== Film ===
Year	Title	Role	Notes
2007	Cinderella III: A Twist in Time	Anastasia	Singing voice
2007	The Number 23	Attractive Coed	
2007	Boogeyman 2	Gloria	
2016	Opening Night	Brandy	
2021	The Many Saints of Newark	Iris Balducci	

=== Television ===
Year	Title	Role	Notes
1997–1998	Fame L.A.	Liz Clark	21 episodes
1998	Chicago Hope	Antoinette Mangelli	Episode: "Deliverance"
1998	The King of Queens	Debbie	Episode: "Head First"
2001	The Fighting Fitzgeralds	Kelli	Episode: "When Irish Eyes Are Smilin'"
2001	Nikki	Jenna	Episode: "Love at First Dwight"
2001	Kristin	Roz	Episode: "The In-Crowd"
2001	Thieves	Leslie	Episode: "Liver Let Die"
2002	JAG	Lt. Urbanski	Episode: "Critical Condition"
2003	The Electric Piper	Janis Dixon (voice)	Television film
2003	NYPD Blue	Roberta Pisano	Episode: "Nude Awakening"
2003	The District	Det. Barbara Flaherty	2 episodes
2004	Charmed	Ramona Shaw	Episode: "Hyde School Reunion"
2010	The Suite Life on Deck	Isabel Cruz	Episode: "Can You Dig It?"
2012	Major Crimes	Dee Dee Shaw	Episode: "Before and After"
2015	The Good Wife	Mama Jill	Episode: "Cooked"
2015	Donny!	Piper	2 episodes
2017–2018	Homeland	Sharon Aldright	4 episodes
2018	Seven Seconds	Crystal DiAngelo	5 episodes
2018	Instinct	Maria Fucci / Monica Fucci	2 episodes
2018	Elementary	Sherry Lennox	Episode: "Breathe"
2018	Most Likely To	Liz Cooney	Television film
2019	Transparent	Tara	Episode: "Transparent Musicale Finale"
2021	The Crew	Morgan Conrad	2 episodes
2021	Younger	Lizalot Miller	Episode: "Older"
2021	HouseBroken	Various roles	5 episodes
2022	The Fairly OddParents: Fairly Odder	Judy Stoneface	5 episodes
2026	The Muppet Show	Audience Member	Uncredited

== Awards and nominations ==
Year	Award	Category	Work	Result
2009	Laurence Olivier Award	Best Performance in a Supporting Role in a Musical	Zorro	Won
2009	WhatsOnStage Award	Best Supporting Actress in a Musical	Zorro	Nominated
2013	Astaire Award	Outstanding Female Dancer in a Broadway Show	Matilda the Musical	Nominated
2016	Astaire Award	Outstanding Ensemble in a Broadway Show	Dames at Sea	Nominated
2018	Drama Desk Award	Outstanding Solo Performance	Who's Holiday!	Nominated
2018	Lucille Lortel Award	Outstanding Solo Show	Who's Holiday!	Nominated
2018	Off Broadway Alliance Award	Best Solo Performance	Who's Holiday!	Nominated
2025	Drama Desk Award	Outstanding Featured Performance in a Musical	Gypsy	Nominated
