= Cordovan hat =

Traditional Andalusian wide-brimmed hat

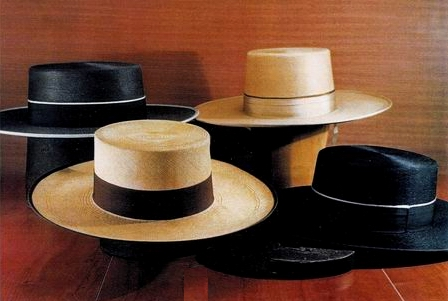
- Sombreros cordobeses
- Type: Hat
- Material: Wool felt
- Place of origin: Córdoba, Spain

The Cordovan hat (in Spanish, sombrero cordobés) is a traditional hat made in the city of Córdoba, Spain, and traditionally worn in a large part of Andalusia. In the Spanish-speaking world outside of Andalusia, the term can simply mean "wide-brimmed hat".

== Characteristics ==
Although the sombrero cordobés has no standard sizes, the height of the crown can vary from 10 to 12 centimetres (3.9 to 4.7 in), and the width of the brim can vary from 8 to 12 centimetres (3.1 to 4.7 in).

Although the most traditional color is black, other common colors include red, pearl gray, sea green, and navy blue.

== History ==
The origin of the style is unclear. Drawings as early as the 17th century show day laborers wearing this sort of hat. The style became more widespread in the late 19th and early 20th centuries.

Among the people who have worn the sombrero cordobés are Spanish artist Pablo Picasso, flamenco vocalist Juanito Valderrama, the rejoneador Antonio Cañero—so identified with the style that the hat is sometimes called a cañero—and the matador Manolete. It can also be seen in the paintings of Julio Romero de Torres.

The Beatles, on their visit to Spain, wore it as a symbol of the country. Former football player Finidi George of Real Betis always wore it when celebrating after scoring during his time there.

The fictional characters Zorro and Black Hat (from the 2011 film Priest) are often depicted wearing this style of hat.

== See also ==
- List of hat styles

== See also ==
- Boater
