= The Mark of Zorro (1920 film) =

1920 film

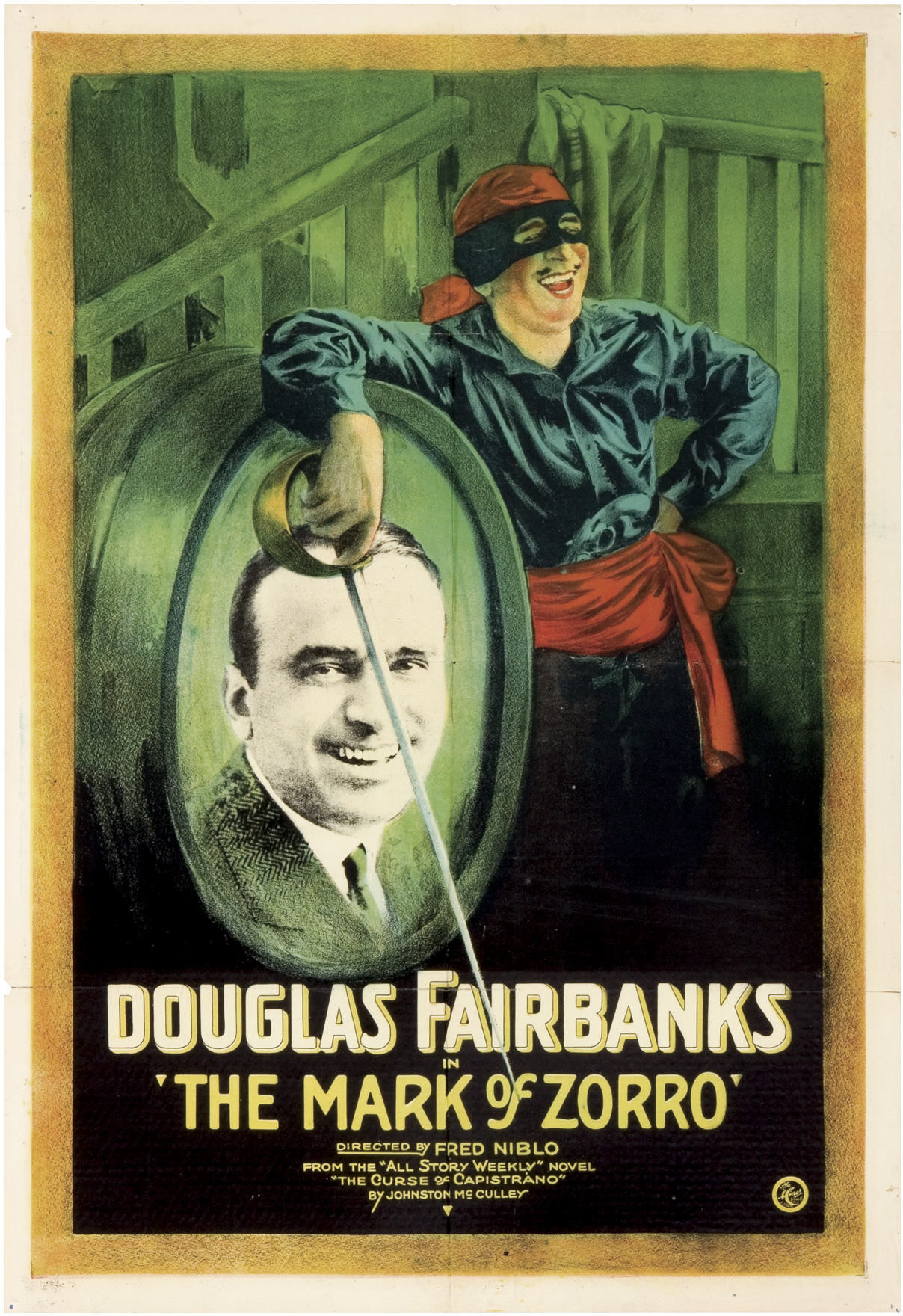
- Directed by: Fred Niblo
- Written by: Douglas Fairbanks; Eugene Miller
- Based on: The Curse of Capistrano; 1919 serial in All-Story Weekly by Johnston McCulley
- Produced by: Douglas Fairbanks
- Starring: Douglas Fairbanks; Marguerite De La Motte; Noah Beery; Robert McKim
- Cinematography: William C. McGann; Harris Thorpe
- Edited by: William Nolan
- Music by: Mortimer Wilson
- Production company: Douglas Fairbanks Pictures Corporation
- Distributed by: United Artists
- Release date: November 27, 1920
- Running time: 101 minutes
- Country: United States
- Language: Silent (English intertitles)
- Budget: $169,187.05
- Box office: over $500,000

The Mark of Zorro

The Mark of Zorro is a 1920 American silent Western romance film starring Douglas Fairbanks and Noah Beery. This genre-defining swashbuckler adventure was the first movie version of The Mark of Zorro. Based on the 1919 story The Curse of Capistrano by Johnston McCulley, which introduced the masked hero, Zorro, the screenplay was adapted by Fairbanks (as "Elton Thomas") and Eugene Miller. Zorro is a character reminiscent of Baroness Orczy's masked hero The Scarlet Pimpernel.

The film was produced by Fairbanks for his own production company, Douglas Fairbanks Pictures Corporation, and was the first film released through United Artists, the company formed by Fairbanks, Mary Pickford, Charlie Chaplin, and D. W. Griffith.

Noah Beery Jr. makes his first of many dozens of screen appearances, portraying a young child. His father began sporadically billing himself as Noah Beery Sr. as a result.

The film has been remade twice, once in 1940 (starring Tyrone Power) and again in 1974 (starring Frank Langella). In 2015, the United States Library of Congress selected the film for preservation in the National Film Registry, finding it "culturally, historically, or aesthetically significant".

== Plot ==
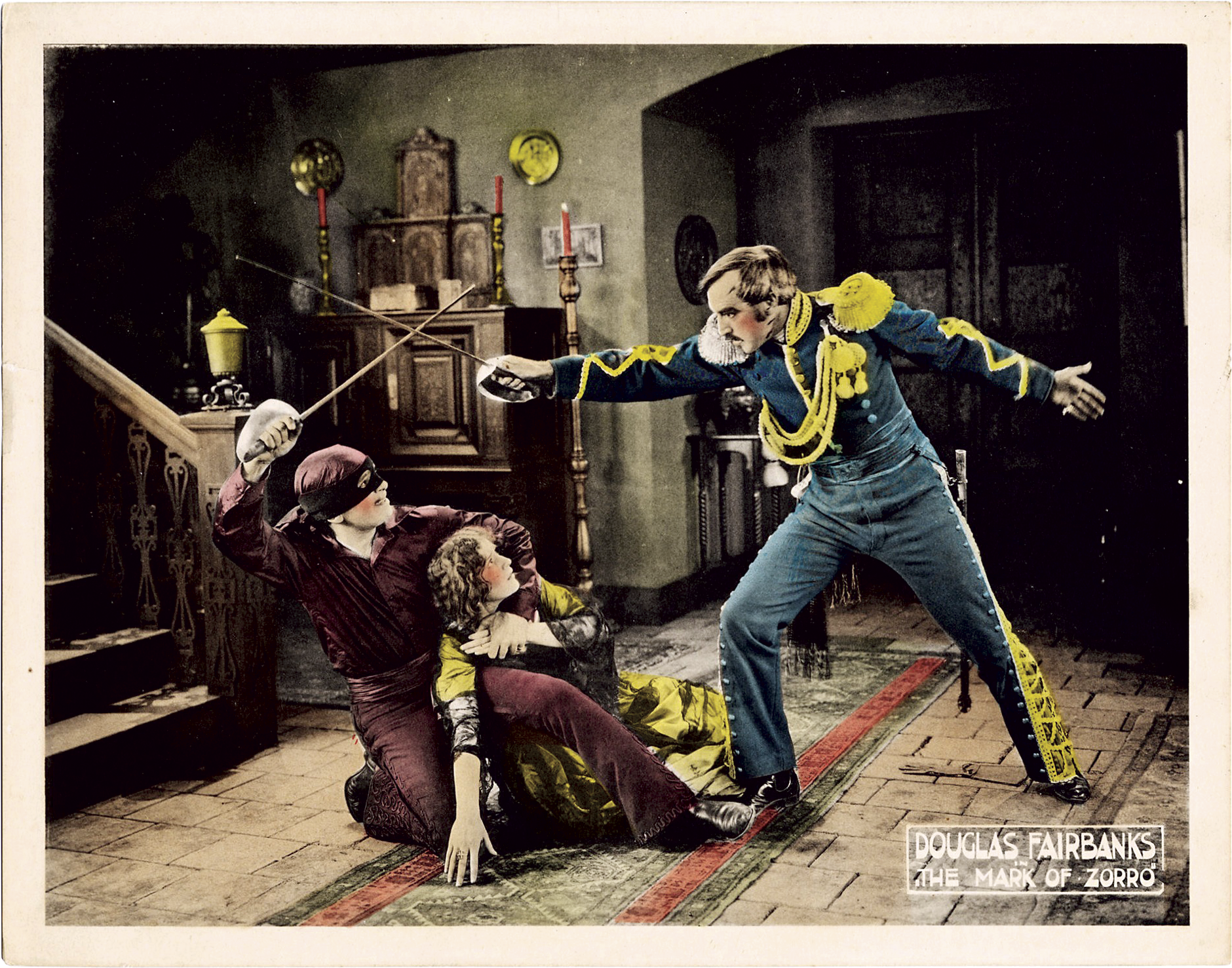
A colorized lobby card showing a scene from the film, 1920

The Mark of Zorro tells the story of Don Diego Vega, the outwardly foppish son of wealthy ranchero Don Alejandro Vega in the old Spanish California of the early 19th century.

Seeing the mistreatment of common citizens by rich landowners and the oppressive colonial government, Don Diego dons the mask of the Robin Hood-like rogue Señor Zorro ("Mr. Fox"), champion of the people, who appears out of nowhere to protect them from the corrupt administration of Governor Alvarado and his henchmen, the villainous Captain Juan Ramon and the brutish Sergeant Pedro Gonzales (Noah Beery, Wallace Beery's older half-brother). With his swift swordplay and an athletic sense of humor, Zorro scars the faces of evildoers with his mark, "Z".

When not in the disguise of Zorro, Don Diego courts the beautiful Lolita Pulido with bad magic tricks and worse manners, though she cannot stand him. Lolita is also courted by Captain Ramon; and by the dashing Zorro, whom she likes.

In the end, when Lolita's family is jailed and impoverished by the machinations of Governor Alvarado, Don Diego throws off his masquerade, wins over the soldiers to his side, forces the wicked governor to abdicate, and wins the hand of Lolita, who is delighted to discover that her effeminate suitor, Diego, is actually the dashing hero.

== Primary cast ==
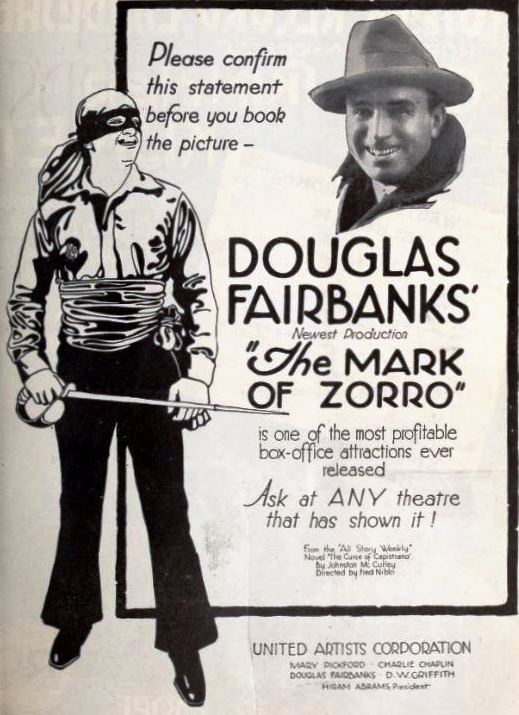
Magazine ad

- Douglas Fairbanks as Don Diego Vega / Señor Zorro
- Marguerite De La Motte as Lolita Pulido
- Noah Beery Sr. as Sergeant Pedro Gonzales
- Charles Hill Mailes as Don Carlos Pulido
- Claire McDowell as Doña Catalina Pulido
- Robert McKim as Captain Juan Ramon
- George Periolat as Governor Alvarado
- Walt Whitman as Father Felipe
- Sidney De Gray as Don Alejandro Vega
- Tote Du Crow as Bernardo, Don Diego's mute servant
- Noah Beery Jr. as Boy
- Charles Stevens as Peon Beaten by Sergeant Gonzales
- Milton Berle (uncredited child)

== Reception and impact ==
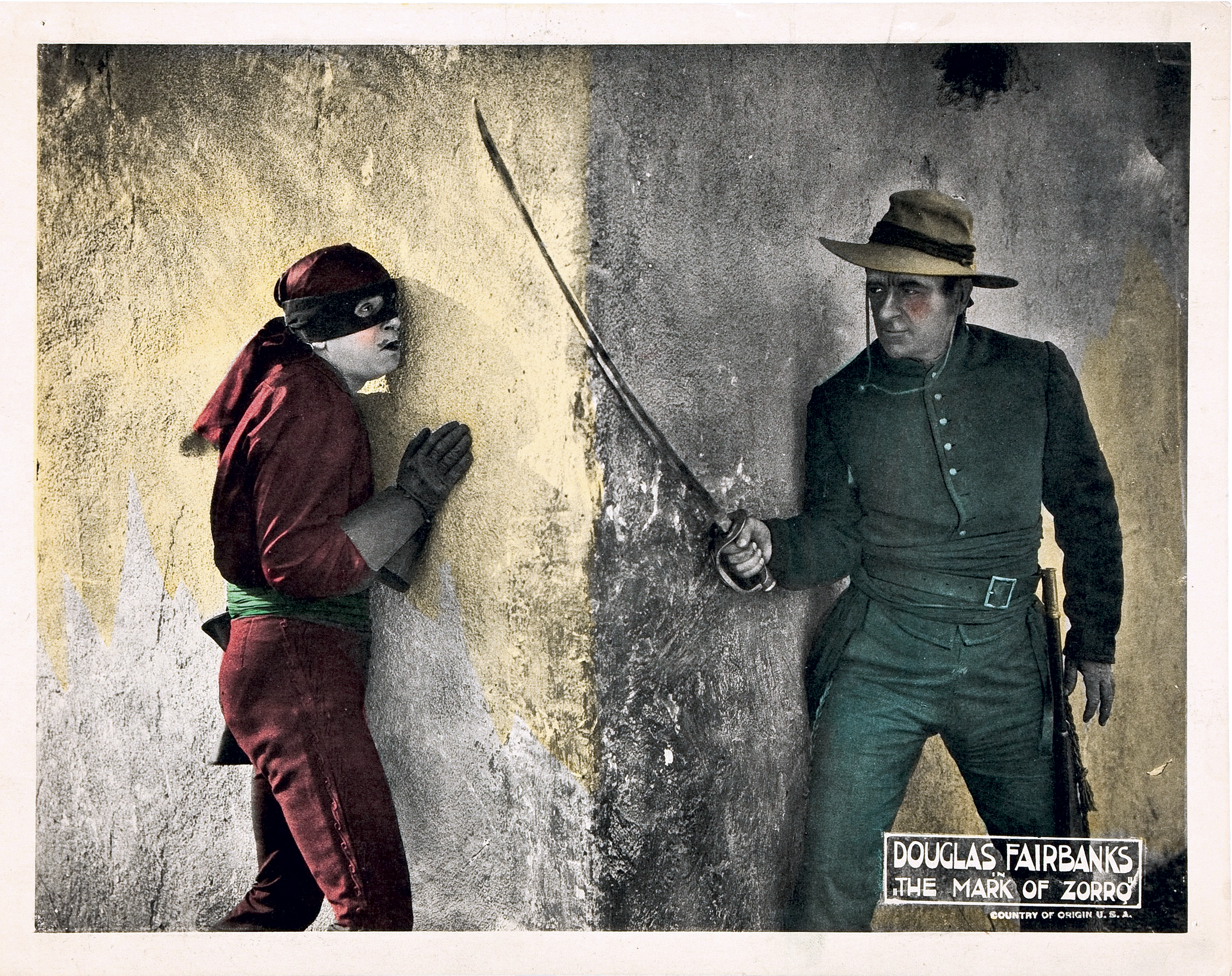
Lobby card

The New York Times gave The Mark of Zorro a mixed review.

Fairbanks biographer Jeffrey Vance, assessing the film's legacy in 2008, writes: "The Mark of Zorro is a landmark, not only in the career of Douglas Fairbanks, but also in the development of the action-adventure film. With this, his thirtieth motion picture, Fairbanks was transitioning from comedies to the costume films for which he is best remembered. Instead of reflecting the times, The Mark of Zorro offers an infusion of the romantic past with a contemporary flair ... Beyond reenergizing his career and redefining a genre, Fairbanks's The Mark of Zorro helped popularize one of the enduring creations of twentieth-century American fiction, a character who was the prototype for comic book heroes such as Batman; In fact, The Mark of Zorro is the canonical movie that the Waynes watched before being murdered."

The Mark of Zorro was preserved by the Academy Film Archive in 2012.
