= The Mark of Zorro (1974 film) =

1974 TV film

- Film poster
- Genre: Western; Action; Adventure
- Based on: The Curse of Capistrano by Johnston McCulley
- Written by: John Taintor Foote
- Teleplay by: Brian Taggart
- Directed by: Don McDougall
- Starring: Frank Langella; Ricardo Montalbán
- Theme music composer: Dominic Frontiere
- Country of origin: United States
- Original language: English

Production
- Producers: Rodrick Paul; Robert C. Thompson
- Production locations: Old Tucson: 201 S. Kinney Road, Tucson, Arizona; San Xavier del Bac Mission: 1950 W. San Xavier Rd, Tucson, Arizona
- Cinematography: Jack Woolf
- Editor: William Martin
- Running time: 78 minutes
- Production companies: 20th Century Fox Television; Thompson-Paul Productions; ABC

Original release
- Network: ABC
- Release: October 29, 1974

The Mark of Zorro is a 1974 American Western television film directed by Don McDougall which stars Frank Langella alongside Gilbert Roland, Yvonne De Carlo, Anne Archer, Ricardo Montalbán and Robert Middleton. The film premiered on ABC on October 29, 1974.

It was also a backdoor pilot for a television series on which ABC declined to pick up the option. The film is a direct remake of, and used Alfred Newman's acclaimed musical score for the 1940 film version along with new incidental music composed by Dominic Frontiere.

== Plot ==
After receiving a letter from his father requesting his immediate return home, Don Diego de la Vega resigns his commission as a cadet and sails from Spain to California. Arriving in the Pueblo of Los Angeles, he learns that his father has been replaced as Alcalde by Don Luis Quintero. Quintero is a puppet of the witty and urbane swordsman, Captain Esteban, and the once-free populace are oppressed by high taxes and cruel laws. Beatings and imprisonment are common for minor infractions.

Diego immediately takes on the persona of a fop to appear ineffectual to the Alcalde and Esteban, earning himself the nickname "peacock". His father perceives him as weak and useless, a sacrifice Diego is willing to endure to achieve his goal. Determined to restore freedom, Diego secretly takes one of a pair of ancestral swords and adopts the disguise of the legendary masked hero, El Zorro. His terror campaign against the Alcalde and the Captain eventually rouses the people against them. In his role as the fop, he romances the Alcalde's beautiful niece, Teresa, whom he grows to love. He simultaneously flirts with the Alcalde's wife, Inez, to gain information and make her lover, Esteban, jealous.

Zorro's old teacher, Frey Felipe, is accused of being Zorro and arrested. Diego effects a rescue, while his father leads the peons and caballeros and marches on the Alcalde's palace. As Zorro forces the Alcalde to sign a letter of resignation, Esteban appears and forces a duel to the death. Esteban- startled when Diego takes off the Zorro mask, quietly says "So... inside a peacock, we find a hawk", lowering his guard just long enough for Diego to finish him off for good.

Hearing the rebels storm the palace, Diego- again wearing the mask, runs outside as Alejandro shows the Alcalde's resignation to the crowd, and then orders Don Luis and his wife be sent back to Spain in dishonor. He then remarks that "the sword of Diego has never enjoyed such distinction", to which Zorro replies "Thank you... Father". Realizing that his son is Zorro, Alejandro smiles as the two raise and cross their swords together in victory.

== Main cast ==
- Frank Langella as Don Diego de la Vega / Zorro
- Ricardo Montalbán as Captain Esteban Montenegro
- Gilbert Roland as Don Alejandro de la Vega
- Yvonne De Carlo as Isabella Vega
- Louise Sorel as Inez Quintero
- Robert Middleton as Don Luis Quintero
- Anne Archer as Teresa
- Jay Hammer as Antonio

== Production ==
Langella said, "I think Bryan Taggart's script... is marvellous. We have a great cast... A good director... I loved doing it. Here was a chance to play on three levels: the young cadet in Spain, the fop Don Diego - and, in his mask, Zorro. I was really playing out my fantasies. I was reliving myself as a small boy sitting in the dark theatre thrilling to Tyrone Power riding through the night as Zorro."

== Reception ==
The Chicago Tribune called it "truly terrific trash you can sink your teeth into". The Los Angeles Times said it was done "in the spirit of good, though occasionally uneasy fun".
