= Zorro (novel) =

2005 novel by Isabel Allende

- First edition cover
- Author: Isabel Allende
- Original title: El Zorro: Comienza la leyenda
- Translator: Margaret Sayers Peden
- Language: Spanish
- Series: Zorro
- Genre: Adventure, Historical Novel
- Published: 2005 HarperCollins
- Publication place: Chile
- Media type: Print (Hardcover, Paperback) and (audio-CD)
- Pages: 382 p
- ISBN: 0-06-077897-0

Zorro (Spanish: El Zorro: comienza la leyenda) is a 2005 novel by Chilean author Isabel Allende. Its subject is the American pulp hero Diego de la Vega, better known as El Zorro (The Fox).

Allende presents her novel as a biography of Zorro. It is the first origin story for this legendary character. She incorporates details from a variety of works featuring the pulp hero, including the film The Mask of Zorro (1998).

== Plot summary ==
Captain Alejandro de la Vega, a Spanish soldier, marries a Native American woman named Regina. He retires from the military and becomes a hacienda owner, and later an alcalde. The two have a son, Diego. While Regina is pregnant with Diego, she befriends Ana, also Native American and a young Christian convert assigned to care for her during her pregnancy. She has her own son, Bernardo, who grows up with Diego and the two become friends. As youths, Diego and Bernardo undergo an indigenous rite of passage to prove their maturity and to find their spirit guides. Bernardo's spirit guide is a horse and Diego's is a fox (zorro in his native Spanish).

Alejandro receives a letter from an old friend, Tomas de Romeu, who resides in what was then French-occupied Spain. Tomas urges Alejandro to send Diego to Barcelona, where he can receive more formal schooling, and learn fencing under the maestro Manuel Escalante. Alejandro reluctantly allows Diego to go, accompanied by Bernardo.

In Barcelona, the young men live with de Romeu and his two young daughters, Juliana and Isabel. Diego is immediately struck by Juliana and decides to pursue her romantically. The main competitor for her affections is Rafael Moncada, whom Diego humiliates in a fencing duel. At Escalante's invitation, Diego joins La Justicia, a secret organization devoted to justice for people who are marginalized in society. He takes the name Zorro.

After Napoleon is exiled, Escalante and de Romeu are arrested on suspicion of being French sympathizers. Diego convinces La Justicia to rescue Escalante. Juliana asks Moncada to use his influence to gain release of her father, Don de Romeu. He conditions his effort on her marrying him. She agrees, but Moncada is unable to secure a release, and de Romeu is executed for treason. Moncada offers protection to Juliana, hoping that she will either marry him or become his mistress. She demands that he compensate her for the loss of her father. He attacks Juliana but Diego and Isabel intervene and subdue him.

The girls and Diego decide to leave the city and head for the Americas. After months of traveling on foot, dressed as religious pilgrims, they reach the port and board a ship captained by Diego's old friend, Santiago de León. When the ship reaches Cuba, it is attacked by a pirate crew led by Jean Lafitte. Diego and the girls are taken hostage. Lafitte takes them to his base in southern Louisiana, where they await a ransom from Alejandro de la Vega. Juliana becomes smitten with Lafitte, until she learns that he is married, to a free woman of color named Catherine.

Diego begins gambling in New Orleans in an attempt to win enough money to buy their freedom. The girls use jewels they obtained before leaving Spain to buy their freedom. Lafitte returns the jewels to Juliana, an indication of his love for her. Catherine's mother tells Juliana that before Catherine died in childbirth with Pierre, she had chosen Juliana to marry Lafitte and raise their son. Juliana agrees to marry Lafitte, and Diego and Isabel are freed.

Diego returns to California with Isabel and her chaperone, to find his father in prison and his lands confiscated by his arch-enemy, Moncada. Diego frees his father from prison, and puts him in the care of the natives and his wife Regina to convalesce. Diego is captured and arrested, but freed by two Zorro figures. Zorro confronts Moncada, forces him to sign a confession of treason, and sends him back to Spain. Diego clears his father's name and succeeds in having the governor drop charges against him.

== Characters ==
Allende creates a world in which her mix of fictional characters, some "borrowed" from earlier Zorro works and others created for this one, interact with known historical figures.

=== Fictional ===
- Juliana de Romeu, Diego de la Vega's (Zorro's) first love interest. In the story she is a very beautiful woman who attracts many men, especially Moncada.
- Isabel de Romeu, Juliana de Romeu's younger sister. At the novel's end, she is revealed to have been "the author" of this account.

==== Traditional ====
- Diego de la Vega (aka Zorro), the protagonist of the novel. His origins, as well as the origin of Zorro, are shown. The novel explains Diego's dual personalities, as well as his turbulent love life.
- Bernardo was Diego de la Vega's "milk brother", because they were nursed by the same woman. He is the second protagonist of the novel. He is the son of Ana, a Native Californian maid who works in the De la Vega hacienda. After he witnesses the rape and murder of his mother, he acts like a mute. He and Diego communicate through sign language and twin telepathy. The rare instances when he speaks aloud are significant. He is married to Light-in-the-Night and they have a son.
- Lolita Pulido, whom Diego courts in McCulley's The Curse of Capistrano (1919), is shown as a young girl who falls in love with the disguised Zorro without realizing that he is her childhood friend Diego. She becomes Zorro's later love interest, replacing Juliana de Romeu.

==== Original ====
- Lechuza Blanca ("White Owl") is the maternal grandmother of Don Diego de la Vega (Zorro). She is a shaman and the spiritual leader of an insurgent Californian native tribe, As Diego's spiritual mentor, she leads him into the vision quest through which he discovers that his guardian spirit is the fox (which in Spanish is "Zorro"). Her daughter Toypurnia is Diego's mother. Lechuza Blanca's name and role are taken from the feature cartoon series The New Adventures of Zorro (1997).
- Toypurnia / Regina de la Vega ("Daughter of Wolf") is the mother of Don Diego de la Vega. Her father was Diego Salazar, a Spanish renegade. She was fostered by wolves briefly during her childhood. She had other names, including Grey Wolf. Toypurnia/Regina figures prominently in the serial Zorro: La Espada y la Rosa (2007). The historical Toypurina was a Tongva woman and Mission Indian living near Mission San Gabriel Arcángel. She led a rebellion against the mission, recruiting people from other villages. She is thought to be a model for the book's character struggling with the California mission clash of cultures.

=== Historical figures ===
- Pedro Fages: The famous feud of the California Governor and his wife Eulalia figure into Diego's family background. He is the intercessor of Alejandro de la Vega, bequeathing to him his vast hacienda.
- George Sand: The famed French novelist is referred to as a young girl in love with Diego. In the novel, she has an alternate history compared to the real George Sand.
- Jean Lafitte: Diego and his companions are captured by the French pirate known to hide in the Louisiana bayous. His all–black attire is the inspiration for Zorro's costume. He is the lover, and later marries Diego's first love Juliana.
- Marie Laveau: The voodoo queen of New Orleans makes a brief appearance, during the time Diego and his companions spend as "guests" of Jean Lafitte. She attempts to cure Catherine Villars, the sick wife of Jean Lafitte. When Catherine dies, Marie is said to interpret Catherine's wish for Juliana to succeed her as the pirate's wife.
- Estanislao: A Yokuts man who led a revolt against the Mission San Jose in 1827.

== Other mentions ==
Allende contributed an essay on the writing of the Zorro novel to Tales of Zorro. This was the first anthology of original Zorro short fiction, edited by Richard Dean Starr and published by Moonstone Books.
