= The Mark of Zorro (1940 film) =

1940 film by Rouben Mamoulian

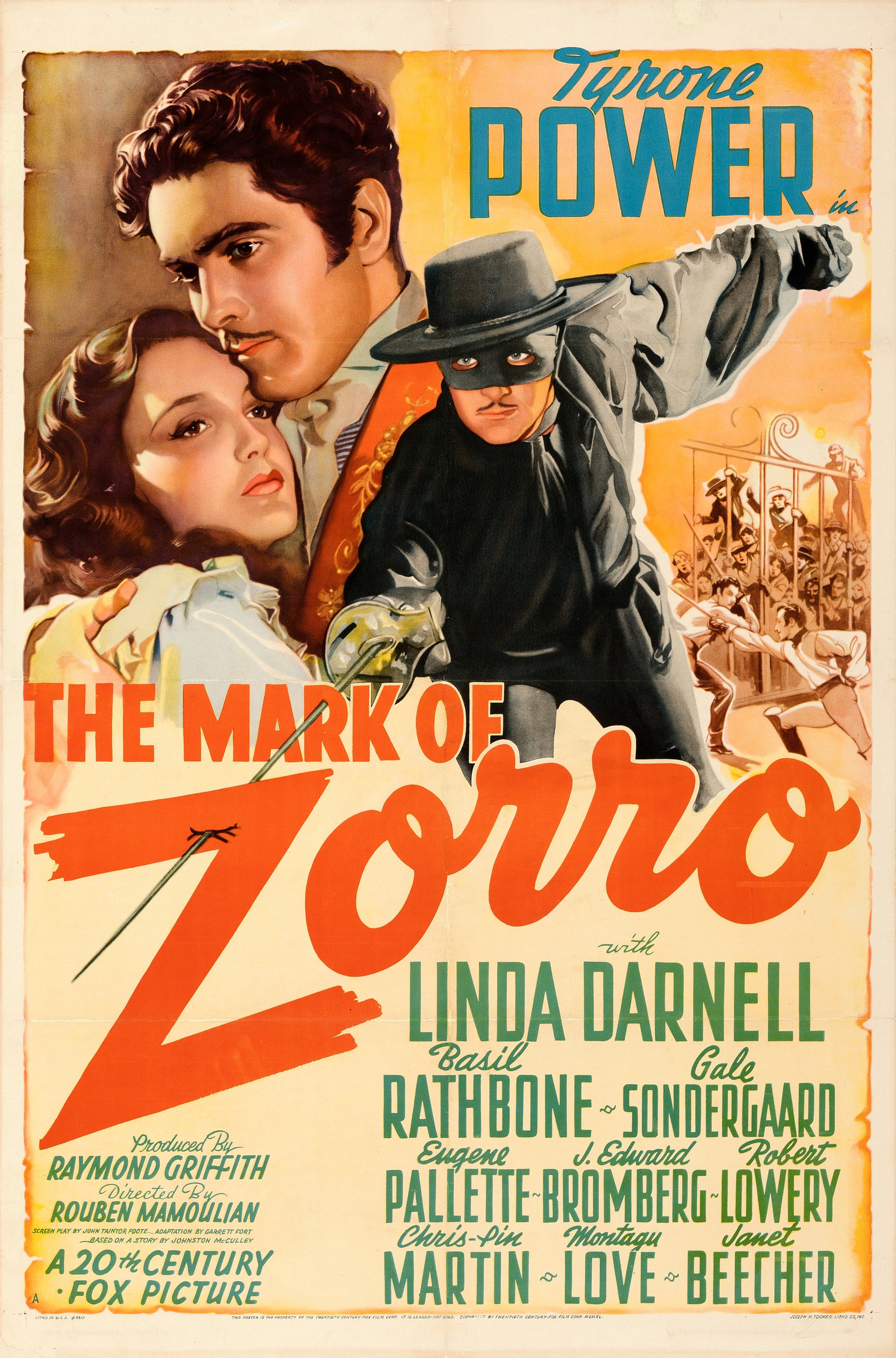
- Theatrical release poster
- Directed by: Rouben Mamoulian
- Screenplay by: John Taintor Foote
- Story by: Garrett Fort; Bess Meredyth
- Based on: The Curse of Capistrano; 1919 serial story in All-Story Weekly by Johnston McCulley
- Produced by: Darryl F. Zanuck
- Starring: Tyrone Power; Linda Darnell; Basil Rathbone
- Cinematography: Arthur C. Miller
- Edited by: Robert Bischoff
- Music by: Alfred Newman
- Distributed by: 20th Century-Fox
- Release date: November 8, 1940
- Running time: 94 minutes
- Country: United States
- Languages: English; Spanish
- Budget: $1 million
- Box office: $2 million (rentals)

The Mark of Zorro is a 1940 American black-and-white swashbuckling film released by 20th Century-Fox, directed by Rouben Mamoulian, produced by Darryl F. Zanuck, and starring Tyrone Power, Linda Darnell, and Basil Rathbone. The Mark of Zorro was nominated for an Academy Award for Best Original Score.

The film is based on the novel The Curse of Capistrano by Johnston McCulley, originally published in 1919 in five serialized installments in All-Story Weekly, which introduced the masked hero Zorro; the story is set in Southern California during the early 19th century. After the enormous success of the silent 1920 film adaptation The Mark of Zorro, the novel was republished under that name by Grosset & Dunlap.

In 2009, the film was selected for preservation in the National Film Registry by the Library of Congress for being "culturally, historically or aesthetically significant".

== Plot ==
Don Diego Vega is urgently called home by his father. To all outward appearances, he is the foppish son of a wealthy ranchero, the former alcalde Don Alejandro Vega, having returned to Alta California, Mexico, after his military education in Spain.

Don Diego is horrified at the way the common people are mistreated by the corrupt new alcalde, Luis Quintero. Don Diego quickly adopts the guise of El Zorro ("The Fox"), a masked outlaw dressed entirely in black, who becomes the defender of the common people and a champion for justice against the uncaring Quintero and his garrison of brutish soldiers.

In the meantime, he romances the alcalde's beautiful and innocent niece, Lolita, whom he grows to love. As part of his plan, Don Diego simultaneously flirts with the alcalde's wife Inez, filling her head with tales of fashion and culture while nurturing her desire to finally get rid of her cruel husband.

In both his guises, Don Diego must always contend with the governor's most capable henchman, the malevolent and deadly Captain Esteban Pasquale. When the situation comes to a head, he eventually dispatches the captain during a fast-moving saber duel-to-the-death, as the alcalde looks on in astonishment. This action leads to a forced regime change with the help of the people of Los Angeles, the other landowners, and his father, and Quintero is defeated.

== Cast ==
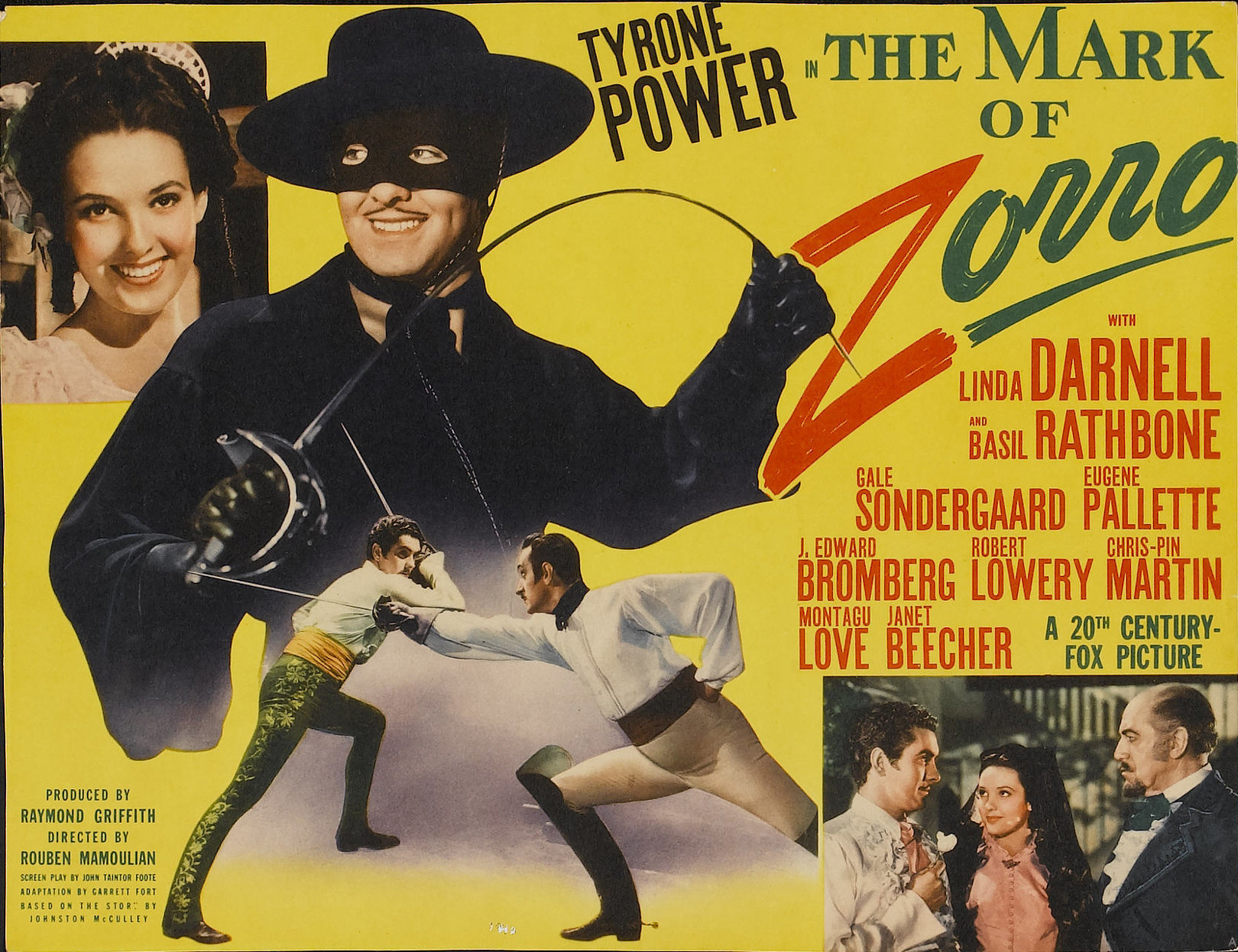
Lobby card

- Tyrone Power as Don Diego Vega/Zorro
- Linda Darnell as Lolita Quintero
- Basil Rathbone as Captain Esteban Pasquale
- Gale Sondergaard as Inez Quintero
- Eugene Pallette as Friar Felipe
- J. Edward Bromberg as Don Luis Quintero
- Montagu Love as Don Alejandro Vega
- Janet Beecher as Señora Isabella Vega
- George Regas as Sergeant Gonzales
- Chris-Pin Martin as Turnkey
- Robert Lowery as Rodrigo
- Belle Mitchell as Maria
- John Bleifer as Pedro
- Frank Puglia as Proprietor
- Eugene Borden as Officer of the Day
- Pedro de Cordoba as Don Miguel
- Guy D'Ennery as Don José
- Stanley Andrews as Commanding Officer (uncredited)
- Fortunio Bonanova as Sentry (uncredited)
- Charles Stevens as José (uncredited)

== Reception ==
Critic Bosley Crowther at the New York Times expresses good-spirited contempt for the film, comparing it unfavorably to the silent film version starring Douglas Fairbanks. Crowther also notes that in 1940, audiences were experiencing "mask" fatigue: "Your regular movie-goer of late has become more or less blasé over the doings of various Lone Rangers and heroes of the Masked Marvel stamp. So there may not be quite the same old punch that there was twenty years ago in this story of the dashing young Spaniard who rode mysteriously through the night, performing great deeds of daring with reckless imprudence in order to rid the land of a cruelly oppressive tyrant." Crowther praises the film for its "lively, exciting clip" and its "excellent cast of expansive actors".

== Retrospective appraisal ==
Film historian Tom Milne considers The Mark of Zorro, director Mamoulian's first foray in action-adventure pictures, "a masterpiece of the genre" and simultaneously a deviation from the formula. Milne notes how little "action" actually occurs throughout the picture and how rarely Zorro (Tyrone Power) engages in the "swashbuckling" athleticism which characterized Douglas Fairbanks' Zorro in the 1920 silent version of the same name. Milne observes that Power was not required to engage in these Fairbanks-like gymnastics: "Mamoulian was doing the swashbuckling for him."

The impression that Power is everywhere at once, in almost continuous motion in action sequences, is effected through "cutting on movement", a method that Mamoulian used to create the impression of relentless action. Milne admits that The Mark of Zorro is merely a "swashbuckle" but nonetheless "one of Mamoulian's most elegant and intelligent films".

== Theme ==
"Power was the most agile man with a sword I've ever faced before a camera. Tyrone could have fenced Errol Flynn into a cocked hat." – Basil Rathbone from his 1962 memoir In and Out of Character.

Two related thematic elements converge in the narrative of The Mark of Zorro: the Oedipal struggle and the duality in the character of Don Diego Vega/Zorro. Director Mamoulian's films had dealt with "double identities", most notably in Dr. Jekyll and Mr. Hyde (1931). The Mark of Zorro presents another protagonist with "a double life". Diego crafts an outward persona that is "stereotypically feminine" — gentle, sensitive and ineffectual. His performance is itself a masking of his true self; that of a virile male possessing "guile, wit and superior intellect".

Diego's masculine identity only emerges when he dons his mask and becomes Zorro. Diego's discovery that his rightful heritage is usurped by a malignant male authoritarian transforms the youth into the avenging Zorro, who proceeds to destroy "the evil father" figure.

Film historian Marc Spergel discovers another theme in the film's narrative, an "allusion" to the conflict between the Hollywood film industry establishment and the emerging union organization among employees. The Zorro figure seeks to strip power from the powerful usurpers and hand it to those worthy of merit.

== Remake, music score, and sequel ==
The Mark of Zorro (1974) is a made-for-television remake film starring Frank Langella and co-starring Ricardo Montalbán in the roles played by Power and Rathbone in the original. It reuses Alfred Newman's original film score, along with new incidental music composed by Dominic Frontiere.

Portions of Newman's original music score were reused by composer Ian Fraser for the George Hamilton swashbuckling comedy film Zorro, the Gay Blade (1981). The film's storyline is a tongue-in-cheek sequel to the original 1940 film. Hamilton sent a note to director Rouben Mamoulian informing him that Zorro, the Gay Blade was being dedicated to him in honor of his 1940 version starring Tyrone Power.

== 1920 silent version ==
The Mark of Zorro is a sound remake of the lavish 1920 smash-hit silent film starring Douglas Fairbanks as Zorro and Noah Beery Sr. as Sergeant Gonzales. This film depiction includes Don Diego's mother, Isabella, but it omits Bernardo (Don Diego's mute servant). That 1920 feature introduced Zorro's iconic all-black costume, subsequently incorporated into Johnston McCulley's later Zorro stories in his original fiction series upon which Fairbanks' film had been based. The 1920 film was the first in a popular array of swashbuckler action features starring the acrobatic Fairbanks, who had previously appeared mainly in comedies. Clips from the film were incorporated into The Artist nine decades later.

Acknowledging that director Mamoulian's 1940 version is a remake of the Douglas Fairbanks' 1920 swashbuckler, film critic Todd Wiener observes:

"Critics inevitably, and often unfavorably, compare the film to the earlier successful [silent] version, but Mamoulian's interpretation of the Zorro myth stands on its own merits. Tyrone Power's performance is especially spirited, displaying a range and wry sardonic charm not always evident in his other forays into this genre."

== Batman connection ==
In the DC Comics continuity, The Mark of Zorro is established as the film that the eight-year-old Bruce Wayne had seen with his parents, Thomas and Martha, at a movie theater, only moments before they were killed in front of him by an armed thug (later retconned to be Joe Chill). Zorro is often portrayed as Bruce's childhood hero and an influence on his Batman persona. Discrepancies exist regarding which version Bruce saw: The Dark Knight Returns depicts it as the Tyrone Power version, whereas a story by Alan Grant claims it to be the silent Douglas Fairbanks original. Bill Finger was himself inspired by Fairbanks' Zorro, including similarities in costumes, the "Bat Cave" and Zorro's cave, and unexpected secret identities, especially since the Batman character antedates the Tyrone Power remake by a year. In Batman v Superman: Dawn of Justice (set in the DCEU continuity), Bruce and his parents leave a screening of 1940's The Mark of Zorro the night of their murder.

== Home media ==
The Mark of Zorro has been released twice on DVD. The first was on October 7, 2003, and featured the film in its original black-and-white, as part of 20th Century Fox Studio Classics Collection. The second was released on October 18, 2005, as a Special Edition, featuring both a newly restored black-and-white version and a colorized version, prepared by Legend Films. Both contain the short film "Tyrone Power: The Last Idol" as seen on Biography on the A&E Network, with a commentary by film critic Richard Schickel. Kino Lorber released the film on Blu-ray in 2016.
