= Zorro =

Fictional character

- First appearance: All-Story Weekly (August 1919)
- Created by: Johnston McCulley
- Portrayed by: Douglas Fairbanks; Robert Livingston; Reed Hadley; Tyrone Power; José Suárez; Clayton Moore; Guy Williams; Frank Langella; Henry Darrow; George Hamilton; Rodolfo de Anda; Patrick James; Frank Latimore; Duncan Regehr; Anthony Hopkins; Antonio Banderas; Alain Delon; Christian Meier; Miguel Bernardeau; Cristo Fernández; Jean Dujardin; Richard Gutierrez

In-universe information
- Full name: Don Diego de la Vega
- Species: human
- Occupation: noble Vigilante
- Weapon: Rapier; Bullwhip; Pistol
- Family: Don Alejandro de la Vega (father)
- Nationality: Californian (New Spain)

Zorro (Spanish: [ˈsoro] or [ˈθoro], Spanish for "fox") is a fictional character created in 1919 by American pulp writer Johnston McCulley, appearing in works set in the Pueblo de Los Ángeles in Alta California. Zorro is typically portrayed as a dashing masked vigilante who defends the commoners and Indigenous peoples of California against corrupt, tyrannical officials and other villains.

His signature all-black hero's attire includes Spanish noblemen clothes, a flowing cape, a wide-brimmed Cordovan hat (sombrero cordobés), fencing gloves, equestrian boots, and a domino mask. It is completed with a rapier sword and often features a "Z" emblem on the belt or hat.

In the stories, Zorro has a high bounty on his head, but he is too skilled and cunning for the bumbling authorities to catch; Zorro also delights in publicly humiliating them. The townspeople thus started calling him "El Zorro", because of his fox-like cunning and charm. Zorro is an acrobat and an expert in various weapons. Still, the one he employs most frequently is his rapier, which he often uses to carve the initial "Z" on his defeated foes and other objects to "sign his work". He is also an accomplished rider, his trusty steed being a black horse named Tornado.

Zorro is the secret identity of Don Diego de la Vega (originally Don Diego Vega), a young Californio man who is the only son of Don Alejandro de la Vega, the wealthiest landowner in California. Diego's mother is dead. In most versions, Diego learned his swordsmanship while at university in Spain and created his masked alter-ego after he was unexpectedly summoned home by his father because California had fallen into the hands of an oppressive dictator. Diego is usually shown living with his father in a vast hacienda, which contains many secret passages and tunnels leading to a secret cave that serves as headquarters for Zorro's operations and as Tornado's hiding place. To divert suspicion about his identity, Diego hides his fighting abilities while pretending to be a coward and a fop.

Zorro debuted in the 1919 novel The Curse of Capistrano, originally meant as a stand-alone story. However, the success of the 1920 film adaptation The Mark of Zorro starring Douglas Fairbanks and Noah Beery, which introduced the popular Zorro costume, convinced McCulley to write more Zorro stories for about four decades; the character was featured in a total of five serialized stories and 57 short stories, the last one appearing in print posthumously in 1959, the year after his death. The Curse of Capistrano eventually sold more than 50 million copies, becoming one of the best-selling books of all time. While the rest of McCulley's Zorro stories did not enjoy the same popularity, as most of them were never reprinted until the 21st century, the character also appears in over 40 films and in ten TV series, the most famous being the Disney production, Zorro, of 1957–1959 starring Guy Williams. Other media featuring Zorro include stories by different authors, audio/radio dramas, comic books and strips, stage productions, and video games.

Being one of the earliest examples of a fictional masked avenger with a double identity, Zorro inspired the creation of several similar characters in pulp magazines and other media and is a precursor of the superheroes of American comic books, with Batman and the Lone Ranger drawing particularly close parallels to the character.

== Publishing history ==
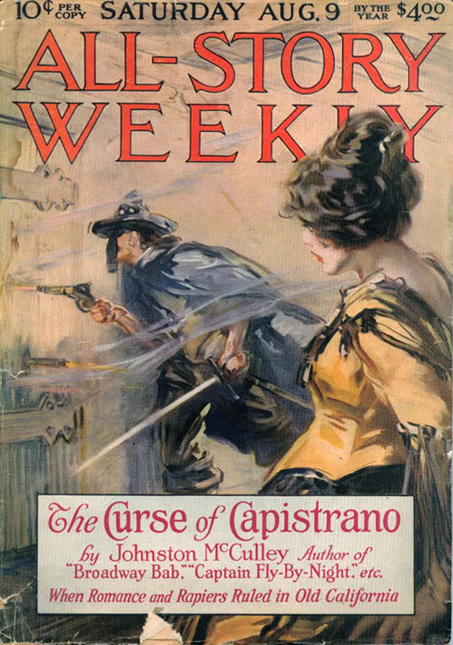
Zorro's debut in the novel The Curse of Capistrano by Johnston McCulley, The All-Story Magazine (August 9, 1919).

Zorro debuted in Johnston McCulley's novel The Curse of Capistrano, serialized in five parts between August 9 and September 6, 1919, in the pulp magazine All-Story Weekly. The story was initially meant as a standalone tale; at the dénouement, Zorro's true identity is revealed to all.

Douglas Fairbanks and Mary Pickford, on their honeymoon, selected the story as the inaugural picture for their new studio, United Artists, beginning the character's cinematic tradition. The novel was adapted as the film The Mark of Zorro (1920), which Fairbanks produced, co-wrote, and starred in as Diego/Zorro. The movie was a commercial success, and the 1924 reprint of McCulley's story by publisher Grosset & Dunlap used the same title, capitalizing on the movie's popularity. The novel has since been reprinted using both titles.

In response to public demand fueled by the film, McCulley wrote more than sixty more Zorro stories, beginning in 1922 with The Further Adventures of Zorro, also serialized in Argosy All-Story Weekly. Fairbanks picked up the movie rights for the sequel that year. However, Fairbanks's sequel, Don Q, Son of Zorro (1925), was based more on the 1919 novel Don Q's Love Story by the mother–son duo Kate Prichard and Hesketh Hesketh-Prichard than on The Further Adventures. Thus, McCulley received no credit for the film.

At first, the production of new Zorro stories proceeded irregularly: the third novel, Zorro Rides Again (not to be confused with the 1937 theatrical serial), was published in 1931, nine years after the second one. Then, between 1932 and 1941, McCulley wrote four short stories and two serialized novels. Zorro stories were published much more frequently between 1944 and 1951 when McCulley published 52 short stories with the character for the West Magazine. "Zorro Rides the Trail!", which appeared in Max Brand's Western Magazine in 1954, is the last story to be published during the author's lifetime and the second-to-last story overall. The last, "The Mask of Zorro" (not to be confused with the 1998 film), was published posthumously in Short Stories for Men in 1959. These stories ignore Zorro's public revelation of his identity.

The Curse of Capistrano eventually sold more than 50 million copies, becoming one of the best-selling books of all time. For the most part, McCulley's other Zorro stories remained overlooked and out-of-print until the 21st century. Bold Venture Press collected all of McCulley's Zorro stories Zorro: The Complete Pulp Adventures, in six volumes.

Over 40 Zorro-titled films were made over the years, including The Mark of Zorro, the 1940 classic starring Tyrone Power and Basil Rathbone. The character was also featured in ten TV series, the most famous being Disney’s Zorro series (1957–59), starring Guy Williams. Zorro appears in several stories written by other authors, comics books and strips, stage productions, video games, and other media. McCulley died in 1958, just as Zorro was at the height of his popularity thanks to the Disney series.

== Fictional character biography ==
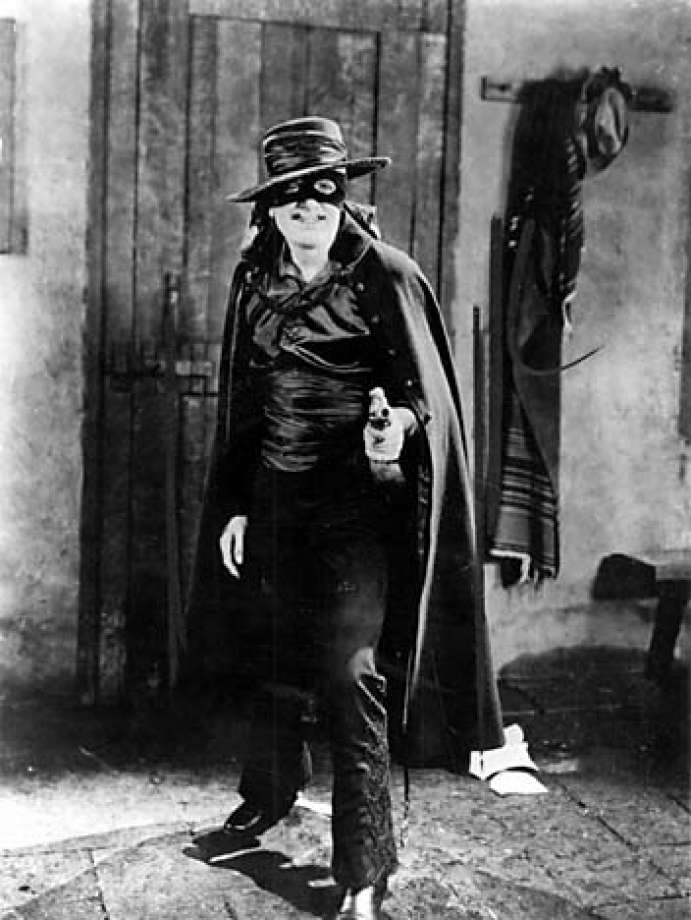
Douglas Fairbanks in the first Zorro film, The Mark of Zorro (1920), which was instrumental in the early success of the character

In The Curse of Capistrano, Señor Zorro became an outlaw in the pueblo of Los Ángeles in California "to avenge the helpless, to punish cruel politicians, to aid the oppressed" and is dubbed the "Curse of Capistrano". The novel features Don Diego Vega and Zorro extensively, but the fact that they are the same person is not revealed to the reader until the end of the book. In the story, Diego and Zorro romance Lolita Pulido, an impoverished noblewoman. While Lolita is unimpressed with Diego, who pretends to be a passionless fop, she is attracted to the dashing Zorro. The main villain is Captain Ramon, who also focuses on Lolita. Other characters include Sgt. Pedro Gonzales, Zorro's enemy but Diego's friend; Diego's deaf and mute servant Bernardo; his ally, Fray (Friar) Felipe; his father, Don Alejandro Vega, the wealthiest landowner in California and a widower; Don Carlos Pulido and his wife, Doña Catalina, Lolita's parents; and a group of noblemen (caballeros) who, at first, hunt Zorro but are then won over to his cause.

In later stories, McCulley introduces characters such as pirates and Native Americans, some of whom know Zorro's identity.

In McCulley's later stories, Diego's surname became de la Vega. Other continuity issues are also evident: For instance, the first magazine serial ended with the villain dead, and Diego was publicly exposed as Zorro; however, in the sequel, the villain was alive, and the next entry had the double identity still secret.

Several Zorro productions have expanded on the character's exploits. Many continuations feature a younger character taking up the mantle of Zorro.

McCulley's stories are set during the era of Spanish Alta California (1769–1821) and, although exact years are often vague, the presence of the Pueblo of Los Angeles means the stories cannot happen before 1781, the year it was founded. Some media adaptations of Zorro's story have placed him during the later era of Mexican Alta California (1821–1848).

== Character motifs ==
Zorro (Guy Williams) and Bernardo (Gene Sheldon) in Walt Disney's 1957–1959 Zorro television series

The character's visual motif is typically a black costume with a black flowing Spanish cloak, a black flat-brimmed hat known as sombrero cordobés, and a black sackcloth mask that covers the top half of his head. Sometimes the mask is a two-piece, the main item being a blindfold-type fabric with slits for the eyes, and the other item is a bandana over the head so that it is covered even if the hat is removed: this is the mask worn in the movie The Mark of Zorro (1920) and in the television series Zorro (1957–1959). Other times, the mask is a one-piece that unites both items described above: this mask was introduced in The Mark of Zorro (1940) and appeared in many modern versions. Zorro's mask has also occasionally been shown as a rounded domino mask, which he wore without wearing a bandana. In his first appearance, Zorro's cloak is purple, his hat is generically referred to as a "wide sombrero", and his black cloth veil mask with slits for eyes covers his whole face. Other features of the costume may vary.

His favored weapon is a rapier, which he also uses to often leave his distinctive mark, a Z cut with three quick strokes, on his defeated foes and other objects to "sign his work". He also uses other weapons, including a bullwhip and a pistol.

The fox is never depicted as Zorro's emblem. It is used as a metaphor for the character's wiliness, such as in the lyrics "Zorro, 'the Fox', so cunning and free ..." from Disney's television series theme.

His heroic pose consists of rearing on his horse, Tornado, often saluting with his hand or raising his sword high. The logo of the company Zorro Productions, Inc. uses an image of Zorro rearing on his horse, sword raised high.

Douglas Fairbanks, Tyrone Power, and Guy Williams used an epee dueling blade with a saber hilt. Antonio Banderas used a transitional rapier.

== Skills and resources ==
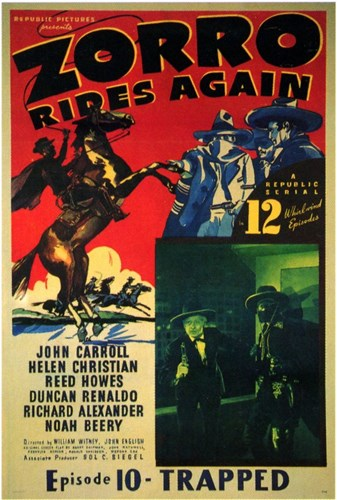
Poster for the serial Zorro Rides Again (1937), starring John Carroll as a descendant of the original Zorro

Zorro specializes in infiltrating heavily guarded enemy structures or territories, espionage, and improvised explosive devices. He is a weapons expert and a master of escape and camouflage. He is also good at deciphering numerous spoken and written languages, facilitating communication with locals regardless of ethnicity or language. Zorro is acrobatic, using his bullwhip as a gymnastic accouterment to swing through gaps between city roofs, and can land from great heights and take a fall. Although he is a master swordsman and marksman, he has repeatedly demonstrated his prowess in unarmed combat against multiple opponents.

In some versions, Zorro keeps a medium-sized dagger tucked in his left boot for emergencies. He has used his cape in creative ways as a blind, a trip-mat, and a disarming tool. Zorro's boots are also sometimes weighted, as is his hat, which he has thrown, Frisbee-style, as an efficiently substantial warning to enemies. He is also a skilled tactician, using mockery to goad his opponents into traps or to irritate them into fighting poorly.

Zorro is a skilled horseman. The name of his jet-black horse has varied through the years. In The Curse of Capistrano, it was unnamed. In Disney's Zorro television series, the horse gets the name Tornado, which has been kept in many later adaptations. In most versions, Zorro keeps Tornado in a secret cave, connected to his hacienda with a system of secret passages and tunnels.

McCulley's concept of a band of men helping Zorro is often absent from other character versions. An exception is Zorro's Fighting Legion (1939), starring Reed Hadley as Diego. In Douglas Fairbanks' version, he also has a band of masked men helping him. In McCulley's stories, Zorro was aided by a deaf-mute named Bernardo. In Disney's Zorro television series, Bernardo is not deaf but pretends to be and serves as Zorro's secret agent. He is a capable and invaluable helper for Zorro, sometimes wearing the mask to reinforce his master's charade. The Family Channel's Zorro television series replaces Bernardo with a teenager named Felipe, played by Juan Diego Botto, with a similar disability and pretense. In Isabel Allende's Zorro: A Novel, Bernardo is the child of the de la Vega's Native housemaid, Ana, who forms a bond with Regina de la Vega, a former native warrior who is converted, Christianized and married to Don Alejandro. Their dual pregnancies result in them giving birth the same night. Due to complications from birth, Regina cannot breastfeed her child, Diego, so Ana breastfeeds both boys, making them milk brothers. The two are shown to be inseparable, which helps Bernardo receive a more formal education and accompanies Diego to Barcelona. After a group of pirates invades the de la Vega home, Bernardo witnesses the rape and murder of his mother, and a result, stops speaking. Diego's grandmother, White Owl, concludes Bernardo refuses to speak as a form of mourning. He is shown to speak to Tornado in a spirit quest and later to a fellow native girl, Light-in-the-Night, whom he marries.

== Characteristics ==
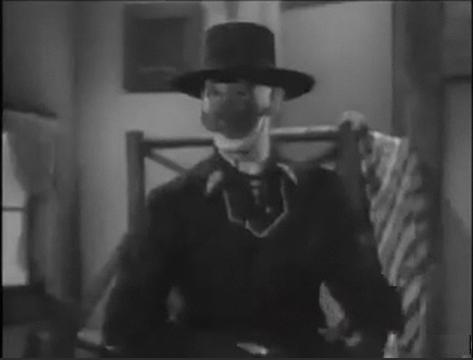
Zorro (Reed Hadley) in the serial Zorro's Fighting Legion (1939)

In The Curse of Capistrano, Diego is described as "a fair youth of excellent blood and twenty-four years, noted the length of El Camino Real for his small interest in the really important things of life." It is also said that "Don Diego was unlike the other full-blooded youths of the times. It appeared that he disliked action. He seldom wore his blade, except as a matter of style and apparel. He was damnably polite to all women and paid court to none. ... Those who knew Don Diego best declared he yawned ten score times a day." Though proud as befitting his class (and seemingly uncaring about the lower classes), he shuns action, rarely wearing his sword except for fashion, and is indifferent to romance with women. This is, of course, a sham. At the end of the novel, Diego explains that he has planned his double identity since he was fifteen:

"It began ten years ago, when I was but a lad of fifteen", he said. "I heard tales of persecution. I saw my friends, the frailes, annoyed and robbed. I saw soldiers beat an old native who was my friend. And then I determined to play this game."

"It would be a difficult game to play, I knew. So I pretended to have small interest in life, so that men never would connect my name with that of the highwayman I expected to become. In secret, I practiced horsemanship and learned how to handle a blade—"

"By the saints, he did", Sergeant Gonzales growled.

"One half of me was the languid Don Diego you all knew, and the other half was the Curse of Capistrano I hoped one day to be. And then the time came, and my work began."

"It is a peculiar thing to explain, señores. The moment I donned cloak and mask, the Don Diego part of me fell away. My body straightened, new blood seemed to course through my veins, my voice grew strong and firm, fire came to me! And the moment I removed cloak and mask I was the languid Don Diego again. Is it not a peculiar thing?"

This part of the backstory was changed in the 1920 film The Mark of Zorro. Diego recently returned from Spain at the movie's start. Zorro later tells Lolita that he learned swordsmanship in Spain. The 1925 sequel Don Q, Son of Zorro expands on this concept by saying that: "Though the home of the De Vegas has long been on California soil, the eldest son of each new generation returns to Spain for a period of travel and study." The 1940 film The Mark of Zorro keeps the idea of Diego learning his swordsmanship in Spain and adds the idea of him being unexpectedly summoned home by his father, Don Alejandro, when California fell into the hand of an oppressing dictator. Both ideas would then be included in most retellings of the character's backstory.

With minor variations, McCulley's portrayal of Diego's personality is followed in most Zorro media.

A notable exception to this portrayal is Disney's Zorro (1957–1959), where Diego, despite using the original façade early in the series, instead becomes a passionate and compassionate crusader for justice and masquerades as "the most inept swordsman in all of California". In this show, everyone knows Diego would love to do what Zorro does but thinks he does not have the skill.

The Family Channel's Zorro (1990–1993) takes this concept further. While Diego pretends to be inept with a sword, the rest of his facade exaggerates his real interests. Diego is well-versed and interested in art, poetry, literature, and science. His facade is pretending to be interested in only these things and not interested in swordplay or action. In this version of the story, Zorro also has a well-equipped laboratory in his hidden cave.

In Isabel Allende's novel, Diego is a mestizo, the son of a Spanish aristocrat and a Shoshone warrior woman. Thus, as a child, Diego is caught between the divine right of nobility and the ways of his Native mother, grandmother, and ancestors.

== Inspirations ==
The historical figure most often associated with the Zorro character is Joaquin Murrieta, whose life was fictionalized in the novel The Life and Adventures of Joaquín Murieta (1854) by John Rollin Ridge. In the 1998 film The Mask of Zorro Murrieta's (fictitious) brother Alejandro succeeds Diego as Zorro. As a hero with a secret identity who taunts his foes by signing his deeds, Zorro finds a direct literary predecessor in Sir Percy Blakeney, hero of the Scarlet Pimpernel pulp series by Emma Orczy.

The character recalls other figures, such as Robin Hood, Reynard the Fox, Salomón Pico, Manuel Rodríguez Erdoíza, and Tiburcio Vásquez. Another possible historical inspiration is William Lamport, an Irish soldier who lived in Mexico in the 17th century. His life was the subject of a fictive book by Vicente Riva Palacio; The Irish Zorro (2004) is a recent biography. Another is Estanislao, a Yokuts man who led a revolt against the Mission San Jose in 1827.

The 1860s, 1880s, and 1900s penny dreadful treatment of the Spring-heeled Jack character as a masked avenger may have inspired some aspects of Zorro's heroic persona. Spring Heeled Jack was portrayed as a nobleman who created a flamboyant, masked alter ego to fight injustice, frequently demonstrated exceptional athletic and combative skills, maintained a hidden lair and was known to carve the letter "S" into walls with his rapier as a calling card.

Like Sir Percy in The Scarlet Pimpernel, Don Diego avoids suspicion by playing the role of an effete dandy who wears lace, writes poetry, and shuns violence. The all-black Fairbanks film costume, which with variations has remained the standard costume for the character, was likely adapted from the Arrow serial film character The Masked Rider (1919). This character was the first Mexican black-clad masked rider on a black horse to appear on the silver screen. Fairbanks's costume in The Mark of Zorro, released the following year, resembled that of the Rider with only slight differences in the mask and hat.

In 1860, Mór Jókai published his novel "Szegény Gazdagok" (Poor Richmen), where the main character is the Hungarian Baron Lénárd Hátszegi, who is supposed to have the alterego of the "Fatia Negra" (The one with the Black face), an outlaw who robs local people during the night, and during the day lives an aristocratic life. The novel's character was inspired by the real-life Hungarian Baron László Nopcsa (1794–1884), who, according to the local legends, had a similar type of alterego.

== Copyright and trademark disputes ==
The copyright and trademark status of the Zorro character and stories have been disputed. At least five works are in the public domain in the United States because at least 95 years have passed after their first release: the 1919 novel The Curse of Capistrano, the 1920 film The Mark of Zorro, the 1922 novel The Further Adventures of Zorro, the 1925 film Don Q, Son of Zorro, and the 1926 film In the Way of Zorro. However, many later Zorro stories are still protected by copyright, and many of those copyrights are owned or controlled by Zorro Productions, Inc., which asserts it "controls the worldwide trademarks and copyrights in the name, visual likeness and the character of Zorro." It further states "[t]he unauthorized, unlicensed use of the name, character and/or likeness of 'Zorro' is an infringement and a violation of state and federal laws."

In 1999, TriStar Pictures, a division of Sony Pictures, sued Del Taco, Inc., due to a fast-food restaurant advertising campaign that allegedly infringed Zorro Productions' claims to a trademark on the character of Zorro. Sony and TriStar had paid licensing fees to Zorro Productions, Inc. for the 1998 film The Mask of Zorro. In an August 1999 order, the court ruled that it would not invalidate Zorro Productions' trademarks because the defendant argued that certain copyrights in Zorro were in the public domain or owned by third parties.

Tessie Santiago as the Queen of Swords

A dispute took place in the 2001 case of Sony Pictures Entertainment v. Fireworks Ent. Group. On January 24, 2001, Sony Pictures, TriStar Pictures and Zorro Productions, Inc., sued Fireworks Entertainment, Paramount Pictures, and Mercury Entertainment, claiming that the Queen of Swords television series infringed upon the copyrights and trademarks of Zorro and associated characters. Queen of Swords is a 2000–2001 television series set in Spanish California during the early 19th century and featuring a hero who wore a black costume with a red sash and demonstrated similarities to the character of Zorro, including the sword-fighting skills, use of a whip and bolas, and horse-riding skills.

Zorro Productions, Inc. argued that it owned the copyright to the original character because Johnston McCulley assigned his Zorro rights to Mitchell Gertz in 1949. Gertz died in 1961, and his estate was transferred to his children, who created Zorro Productions, Inc. Fireworks Entertainment argued that the original rights had already been transferred to Douglas Fairbanks, Sr. in 1920 and provided documents showing this was legally affirmed in 1929, and also questioned whether the copyright was still valid.

The court ruled that "since the copyrights in The Curse of Capistrano and The Mark of Zorro lapsed in 1995 or before, the character Zorro has been in the public domain". Judge Collins also stated, "Plaintiffs' argument that they have a trademark in Zorro because they licensed others to use Zorro, however, is specious. It assumes that ZPI had the right to demand licenses to use Zorro at all." Judge Collins subsequently vacated her ruling following an unopposed motion filed by Sony Pictures, TriStar Pictures, and Zorro Productions, Inc.

In another legal action in 2010, Zorro Productions, Inc., sued Mars Inc., makers of M&M's chocolate candies, and ad agency BBDO Worldwide over a commercial featuring a Zorro-like costume. The case was settled ("each party shall bear its own costs incurred in connection with this action, including its attorney's fees and costs") on August 13, 2010.

In March 2013, Robert W. Cabell, author of Z – the Musical of Zorro (1998), filed another lawsuit against Zorro Productions, Inc. The lawsuit asserted that the Zorro character is in the public domain and that the trademark registrations by Zorro Productions, Inc., are therefore fraudulent. In October 2014, Cabell's lawsuit was dismissed, with the judge ruling that the state of Washington (where the case was filed) did not have jurisdiction over the matter. However the judge later reversed his decision and had the case transferred to California. In May 2017, U.S. District Judge Davila granted Zorro Productions, Inc.'s motion to dismiss Cabell's claim to cancel its federal trademark registrations. Cabell did not appeal.

In June 2015, Robert W. Cabell's legal dispute with Zorro Productions, Inc. resulted in the Community Trade Mark for "Zorro" being declared invalid by the European Union's Office for Harmonization in the Internal Market for goods of classes 16 and 41. This follows the 'Winnetou' ruling of the Office's First Board of Appeal in which the Board of Appeal ruled that the name of famous characters cannot be protected as a trademark in these classes. Zorro Productions appealed the decision, and on December 19, 2017, the EUIPO Fourth Board of Appeal nullified the lower court's ruling, declaring the contested trademarks as valid, and required Cabell to pay the costs of the legal action, the appeal and Zorro Productions' legal fees and costs. Zorro Productions, Inc. owns approximately 1,300 other Zorro-related trademarks worldwide. In May 2018, Judge Edward Davila processed a complaint by Cabell to find Zorro Productions infringed copyright on his musical.

== Legacy ==
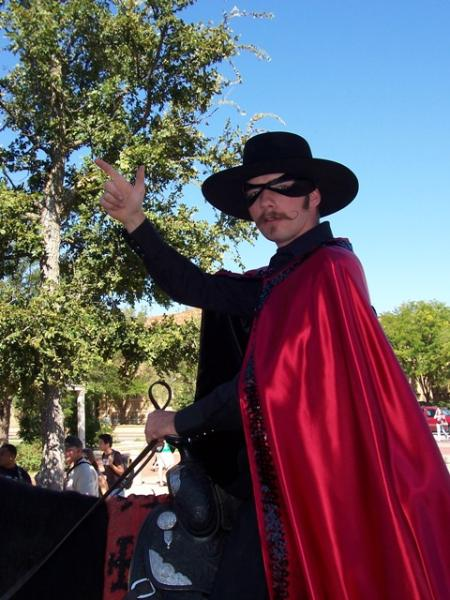
Texas Tech's The Masked Rider

The 1936 film The Vigilantes Are Coming features a masked vigilante with a costume similar to Zorro, which led several countries to name the movie after Zorro: the film was named Zorro l'indomptable in France, Zorro – Der blutrote Adler in Germany, Zorro – den blodrøde ørn in Denmark and Zorro – veripunainen kotka in Finland. The main character, The Eagle, is played by Robert Livingston, who would then play the actual Zorro in the movie The Bold Caballero, also released in 1936.The Vigilantes Are Coming "was a reworking of The Eagle, Rudolph Valentino's silent film." In the film, Valentino plays the masked hero Black Eagle. The Eagle was based on the posthumously published 1841 novel Dubrovsky by Alexander Pushkin; the Black Eagle does not exist in the novel and was inspired by the performance of Douglas Fairbanks as Zorro in The Mark of Zorro.

The Masked Rider, the primary mascot of Texas Tech University, is similar to Zorro. Originally called "Ghost Rider", it was an unofficial mascot appearing in a few games in 1936 and then became the official mascot with the 1954 Gator Bowl.

As one of the earliest examples of a fictional avenger with a double identity, Zorro inspired the creation of several similar characters in pulp magazines and other media and is a precursor of the superheroes of American comic books. Jerry Siegel credited Zorro along with The Scarlet Pimpernel as inspirations for the creation of Superman, particularly the concept of a dual identity as mild-mannered reporter Clark Kent. Siegel thought this would make for interesting dramatic contrast and good humor. Superman's stance as the Champion of the Oppressed and devil-may-care attitude during his early Golden Age appearances were influenced by the characters of The Mark of Zorro star Douglas Fairbanks, who starred in similar adventure films such as Robin Hood.

Also, Bob Kane has credited Zorro, as one of the earliest examples of a fictional masked avenger with a dual identity, as part of the inspiration for the character Batman, which was created in 1939. Like Don Diego de la Vega, Bruce Wayne is affluent, the heir of wealth built by his parents. His everyday persona encourages others to think of him as shallow, foolish, and uncaring to throw off suspicion. Frank Miller's comic book miniseries The Dark Knight Returns (1986) and The Dark Knight Strikes Again (2001–2002) both include multiple Zorro references, such as Batman inscribing a Z on a defeated foe. In later tellings of Batman's origins, Bruce Wayne's parents are murdered by a robber as the family leaves a showing of the 1940 film The Mark of Zorro, starring Tyrone Power.

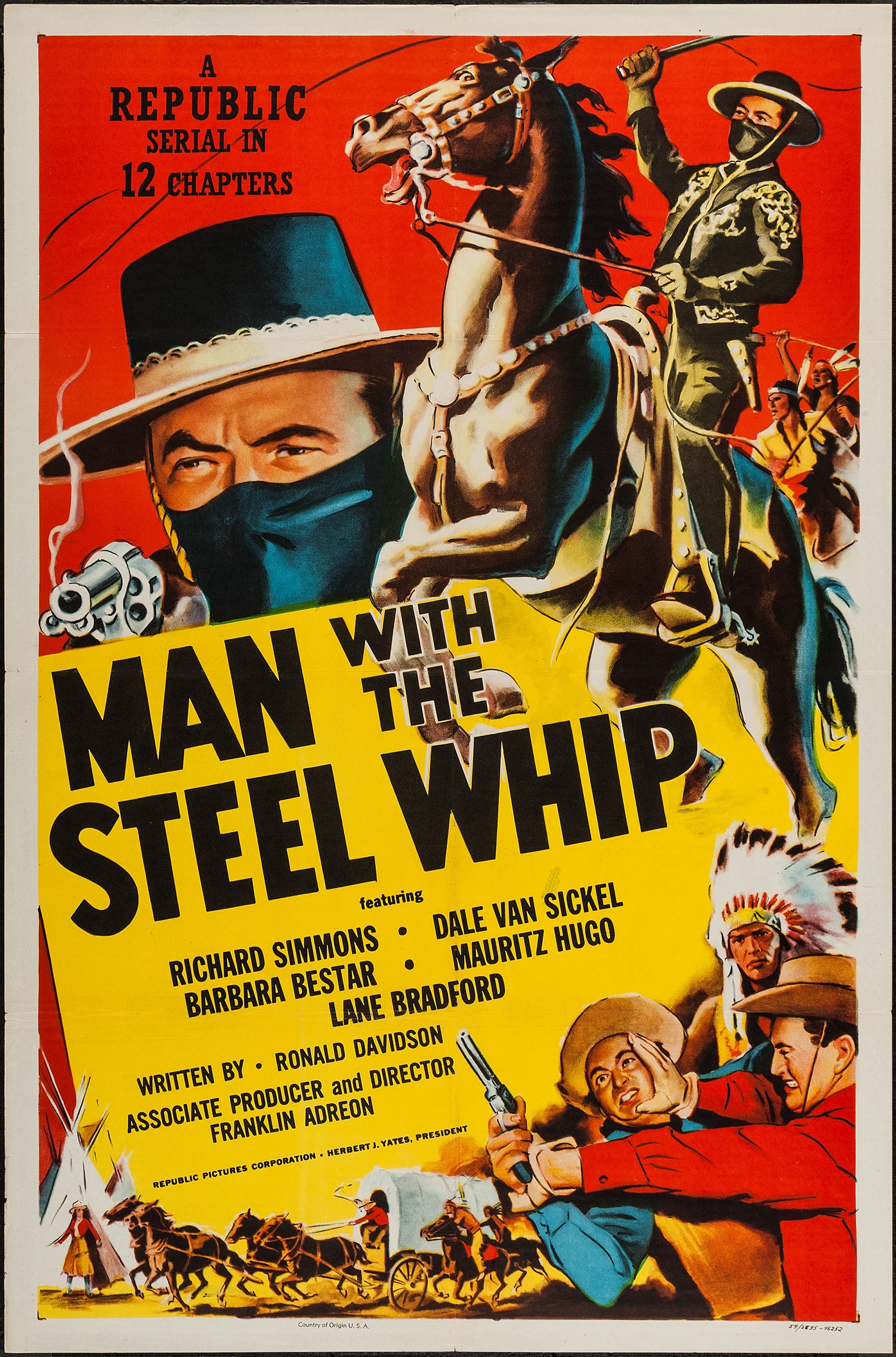
Poster from Man with the Steel Whip (1954)

Zorro inspired a similar pulp character known as El Coyote, created in 1943 by José Mallorquí. A sample superhero character called The Fox appearing in the Supers supplement of the GURPS role-playing system is also based on Zorro.

In Mexico, Raúl de Anda played the hero Charro Negro in the films El Charro Negro (1940), La vuelta del Charro Negro (1941), and La venganza del Charro Negro (1941). Other similar characters include Mauricio Rosales, known as El Rayo, star of El Rayo justiciero (1954), La barranca de la muerte (1954), El Gavilán Vengador (1954), and La sierra del terror (1955), all directed by Jaime Salvador; and Águila Negra, in films such as El tesoro de la muerte (1953), El vengador solitario (1953), El Águila Negra en La ley de los fuertes (1956), and El Águila Negra contra los diablos de la pradera (1956), directed by Ramón Peón.

The Republic Pictures serials Don Daredevil Rides Again (1951) and Man with the Steel Whip (1954) feature masked heroes similar to Zorro: Don Daredevil and El Latigo. Republic had previously released five Zorro serials between 1937 and 1949 but had since lost the license for the character and could not use him anymore. The serial makes frequent use of stock footage from all five Zorro serials, with scenes originally showing Zorro now being interpreted as showing Don Daredevil and El Latigo: the result of this is that the costume and body shape of Don Daredevil and El Latigo keeps changing between scenes, even becoming female in scenes taken from Zorro's Black Whip (1944).

The 1956 musical comedy The Court Jester features a masked freedom fighter called The Black Fox (played by Edward Ashley), who combines aspects of both Zorro and Robin Hood.

Hanna-Barbera Productions' animated series Pixie and Dixie and Mr. Jinks (1958–1961) featured a Zorro-like character with a mask, cape, and sword known in the episode "Mark of the Mouse" (1959). Hanna-Barbera Production's animated series The Quick Draw McGraw Show (1959–1962) features El Kabong, an alternate persona of the main character Quick Draw McGraw which is loosely based upon Zorro.

In the animated series Justice League (2001–2004), a DC Comics character, El Diablo, bears a striking similarity to Zorro, in that he wears the same style hat, mask, sash, and cape. The main difference is that his primary weapon is a whip. The Lazarus Lane version of El Diablo appears in Justice League Unlimited (2004–2006), voiced by Néstor Carbonell. While designed after his comic appearance, elements from Zorro's appearance were added. Seen in the episode "The Once and Future Thing" (2005), he appears alongside Pow Wow Smith, Bat Lash, and Jonah Hex.

In 2015, the M7 Con Western Convention, held at the Los Angeles Convention Center, featured a segment on the history of Zorro in film and television. The presentation focused on the great Zorro actors including Douglas Fairbanks, Tyrone Power, Guy Williams, and Duncan Regehr. Maestro Ramon Martinez and actor Alex Kruz gave a live demonstration of the Spanish style of fencing known as La Verdadera Destreza. The two dueled live as Zorro and the Comandante, much to the crowd's delight.

A cave that was used as a filming location in various Zorro productions is now known as "Zorro's Cave" and remains in place, now hidden behind a condominium complex, on land that was once the Iverson Movie Ranch in Chatsworth, Los Angeles, recognized as the most widely filmed outdoor shooting location in the history of Hollywood.

The DreamWorks character Puss in Boots, an anthropomorphic cat sporting high boots, a broad-brimmed and feathered sombrero, and a rapier, was also heavily inspired by Zorro (though ultimately based on the earlier Italian fairy tale character of the same name). Portrayed by Antonio Banderas, who had also earlier played Zorro, he premiered as a character in Shrek 2 (2004) and in the later sequels, as well as inspiring spin-off films, Puss in Boots (2011) and Puss in Boots: The Last Wish (2022).

In 2017 the role-playing game Final Fantasy XIV added the rapier-wielding Red Mage job in the Stormblood expansion; it includes a move named Zwerchhau that heavily resembles El Zorro's signature Z-form attack.

== Appearances in media ==
=== Stories by Johnston McCulley ===
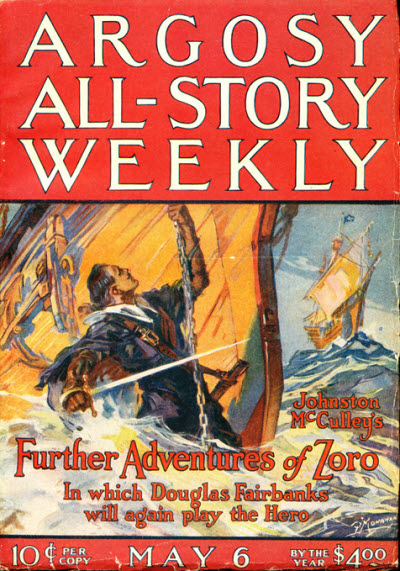
The Further Adventures of Zorro, Argosy Vol. 142 No. 4, May 6, 1922.

The original stories were published in pulp magazines from the 1910s to the 1950s. Most remained unpublished in book form until the series of collected editions of Zorro: The Complete Pulp Adventures, issued in 2016 and 2017.

- Zorro: The Complete Pulp Adventures Vol. 1 (2016)
  - The Curse of Capistrano, All-Story Weekly Vol. 100 No. 2 – Vol. 101 No. 2, serialized in five parts, August 9, 1919 – September 6, 1919 – novella The Curse of Capistrano published by Grosset & Dunlap in 1919, and reissued as The Mark of Zorro in 1924 by the same editor
  - "Zorro Saves A Friend", Argosy Vol. 234 No. 1, November 12, 1932
  - "Zorro Hunts A Jackal", Argosy Vol. 237 No. 6, April 22, 1933 (a.k.a. Zorro Hunts by Night)
- Zorro: The Complete Pulp Adventures Vol. 2 (2016)
  - The Further Adventures of Zorro, Argosy Vol. 142 No. 4 – Vol. 143 No. 3, serialized in six parts, May 6, 1922 – June 10, 1922, reissued by L. Harper Allen as The Sword of Zorro in 1928
  - "Zorro Deals With Treason", Argosy Vol. 249 No. 2, August 18, 1934
  - "Mysterious Don Miguel", Argosy Weekly, Vol. 258 No. 5 – No. 6, serialized in two parts, September 21, 1935 – September 28, 1935
- Zorro: The Complete Pulp Adventures Vol. 3 (2016)
  - Zorro Rides Again, Argosy Vol. 224 No. 3 – Vol. 224 No. 6, serialized in four parts, October 3, 1931 – October 24, 1931
  - "Zorro Draws a Blade", West Magazine Vol. 56 No. 2, July 1944
  - "Zorro Upsets a Plot", West Magazine Vol. 56 No. 3, September 1944
  - "Zorro Strikes Again", West Magazine Vol. 57 No. 1, November 1944
  - "Zorro Saves a Herd", West Magazine Vol. 57 No. 2, January 1945
  - "Zorro Runs the Gauntlet", West Magazine Vol. 57 No. 3, March 1945
  - "Zorro Fights a Duel", West Magazine Vol. 58 No. 1, May 1945
  - "Zorro Opens a Cage", West Magazine Vol. 58 No. 2, July 1945
  - "Zorro Prevents a War", West Magazine Vol. 58 No. 3, September 1945
  - "Zorro Fights a Friend", West Magazine Vol. 59 No. 1, October 1945
  - "Zorro's Hour of Peril", West Magazine Vol. 59 No. 2, November 1945
  - "Zorro Lays a Ghost", West Magazine Vol. 59 No. 3, December 1945
- Zorro: The Complete Pulp Adventures Vol. 4 (2016)
  - The Sign of Zorro, Argosy Vol. 305 No. 2 – Vol. 305 No. 6, serialized in five parts, January 25, 1941 – February 22, 1941
  - "Zorro Frees Some Slaves", West Magazine Vol. 60 No. 1, January 1946
  - "Zorro's Double Danger", West Magazine Vol. 60 No. 2, February 1946
  - "Zorro's Masquerade", West Magazine Vol. 60 No. 3, March 1946
  - "Zorro Stops a Panic", West Magazine Vol. 61 No. 1, April 1946
  - "Zorro's Twin Perils", West Magazine Vol. 61 No. 2, May 1946
  - "Zorro Plucks a Pigeon", West Magazine Vol. 61 No. 3, June 1946
  - "Zorro Rides at Dawn" West Magazine Vol. 62 No. 1, July 1946
  - "Zorro Takes the Bait", West Magazine Vol. 62 No. 2, August 1946
  - "Zorro Raids a Caravan", West Magazine Vol. 62 No. 3, October 1946
  - "Zorro's Moment of Fear", West Magazine Vol. 63 No. 3, January 1947
- Zorro: The Complete Pulp Adventures Vol. 5 (2017)
  - "A Task for Zorro", West Magazine Vol. 65 No. 2, June 1947
  - "Zorro Saves His Honor", West Magazine Vol. 64 No. 1, February 1947
  - "Zorro and the Pirate", West Magazine Vol. 64 No. 2, March 1947
  - "Zorro Beats the Drum", West Magazine Vol. 64 No. 3, April 1947
  - "Zorro's Strange Duel", West Magazine Vol. 65 No. 1, May 1947
  - "Zorro's Masked Menace", West Magazine Vol. 65 No. 3, July 1947
  - "Zorro Aids an Invalid", West Magazine Vol. 66 No. 1, August 1947
  - "Zorro Saves an American", West Magazine Vol. 66 No. 2, September 1947
  - "Zorro Meets a Rogue", West Magazine Vol. 66 No. 3, October 1947
  - "Zorro Races with Death", West Magazine Vol. 67 No. 1, November 1947
  - "Zorro Fights for Peace", West Magazine Vol. 67 No. 2, December 1947
  - "Zorro Serenades a Siren", West Magazine Vol. 68 No. 1, February 1948
  - "Zorro Meets a Wizard", West Magazine Vol. 68 No. 2, March 1948
  - "Zorro Fights with Fire", West Magazine Vol. 68 No. 3, April 1948
  - "Gold for a Tyrant", West Magazine Vol. 69 No. 1, May 1948
  - "The Hide Hunter", West Magazine Vol. 69 No. 2, July 1948
- Zorro: The Complete Pulp Adventures Vol. 6 (2017)
  - "Zorro's Fight for Life", West Magazine, Vol. 74 No. 2, July 1951
  - "Zorro Shears Some Wolves", West Magazine Vol. 69 No. 3, September 1948
  - "The Face Behind the Mask", West Magazine Vol. 70 No. 1, November 1948
  - "Zorro Starts the New Year", West Magazine Vol. 67 No. 3, January 1948
  - "Hangnoose Reward", West Magazine Vol. 70 No. 3, March 1949
  - "Zorro's Hostile Friends", West Magazine Vol. 71 No. 1, May 1949
  - "Zorro's Hot Tortillas", West Magazine Vol. 71 No. 2, July 1949
  - "An Ambush for Zorro", West Magazine Vol. 71 No. 3, September 1949
  - "Zorro Gives Evidence", West Magazine Vol. 72 No. 1, November 1949
  - "Rancho Marauders", West Magazine Vol. 72 No. 2, January 1950
  - "Zorro's Stolen Steed" West Magazine Vol. 73 No. 3, March 1950
  - "Zorro Curbs a Riot", West Magazine Vol. 73 No. 3, September 1950
  - "The Three Stage Peons", West Magazine Vol. 74 No. 1, November 1950
  - "Zorro Nabs a Cutthroat", West Magazine Vol. 74 No. 2, January 1951
  - "Zorro Gathers Taxes", West Magazine Vol. 74 No. 3, March 1951
  - "Zorro Rides the Trail!", Max Brand's Western Magazine, May 1954
  - "The Mask of Zorro", Short Stories for Men Vol. 221 No. 2, April 1959

=== Stories by other authors ===
- Walt Disney's Zorro by Steve Frazee 1958 Whitman Publishing, novelization of some episodes of the 1957 Zorro TV series
- "Zorro Outwits Death", Walt Disney's Magazine Vol. III No. 3, April 1958. Loosely based on the episode "Zorro's Secret Passage" of the 1957 Zorro TV series
- "Zorro's Merry Chase", Walt Disney's Magazine, Vol. III No. 5, August 1958
- "The Fire of the Night", Walt Disney's Magazine, Vol. III No. 6, October 1958 and Vol. IV No. 1, 1958
- "Zorro and the Missing Father", Walt Disney's Magazine, Vol. IV No. 3, April 1959 and No. 4, June 1959. Adapted from the episodes "The Missing Father", "Please Believe Me", and "The Brooch" of the 1957 Zorro TV series
- Zorro by Olivier Séchan 1959 Hachette
- Il Ritorno di Zorro by B.F. Deakin 1968 Arnoldo Mondadori Editore, anthology of nine short stories
- Zorro arrive ! by Jacques Van Hauten 1971 Hachette, novelization of some episodes of the 1957 Zorro TV series
- Le Retour de Zorro by Jean-Claude Deret 1972 Hachette, novelization of some episodes of the 1957 Zorro TV series
- Zorro et le sergent Garcia by Thérèse Bertels 1973 Hachette, novelization of some episodes of the 1957 Zorro TV series
- Zorro et le trésor du Pérou by Thérèse Bertels 1973 Hachette
- Zorro contre le gouverneur by Jean-Claude Deret 1974 Hachette, novelization of some episodes of the 1957 Zorro TV series
- L'Épée de Zorro by Jean-Claude Deret 1975 Hachette
- Zorro et l'épee du cid 1991 Hachette ISBN 9782010182556
- Zorro et la forteresse du diable by Valentin Dechemin 1991 Hachette ISBN 9782010182549, novelization of some episodes of the 1990 Zorro TV series
- Zorro and the Jaguar Warriors by Jerome Preisler September 1998 Tom Doherty Associates, Inc. Books ISBN 978-0-8125-6767-0
- The Mask of Zorro: A Novelization by James Luceno 1998 Pocket Books ISBN 978-0671519896, novelization of the 1998 movie The Mask of Zorro
- The Treasure of Don Diego by William McCay 1998 Minstrel Books ISBN 978-0-671-51968-1, based on the film The Mask of Zorro
- Zorro and The Dragon Riders by David Bergantino March 1999 Tom Doherty Associates, Inc. Books ISBN 978-0-8125-6768-7
- Skull and Crossbones by Frank Lauria 1999 Minstrel Books ISBN 978-0-671-51970-4, based on the film The Mask of Zorro
- The Secret Swordsman by William McCay 1999 Minstrel Books ISBN 978-0-671-51969-8, based on the film The Mask of Zorro
- The Lost Temple by Frank Lauria 1999 Minstrel Books, based on the film The Mask of Zorro
- Lo Spirito e la Spada by Louis A. Tartaglia 1999
- Zorro! by Sally M. Stockton 1999 Cideb, based on the novella The Curse of Capistrano
- El Zorro by Margarita Barberá Quiles 1999 Cideb, based on the novella The Curse of Capistrano
- Zorro and the Witch's Curse by John Whitman April 2000 Tom Doherty Associates, Inc. Books ISBN 978-0-8125-6769-4
- La vera storia di Zorro by Isabella Parrini 2000 Alberti & C. ISBN 978-8887936056
- Zorro: l'ultima avventura ovvero la storia di Zorro, Volume 2 by Isabella Parrini 2001 Alberti & C.
- The Legend of Zorro: A Novelization by Scott Ciencin 2005 HarperCollins ISBN 978-0060833046, novelization of the 2005 movie The Legend of Zorro
- The Lone Ranger/Zorro: The Death Of Zorro By Ande Parks 2012 Simon Bowlands Crossover between The Lone Ranger and Zorro
- Zorro by Isabel Allende 2005 HarperCollins ISBN 0-06-077897-0
- Young Zorro: The Iron Brand by Jan Adkins 2005 HarperCollins ISBN 978-0060839468
- Zorro l'angelo nero della California by Irene Sartini 2007 Alberti & C ISBN 9788889664407
- Zorro l'angelo nero della California – L'avventura continua by Irene Sartini 2008 Alberti & C ISBN 9788889664575
- Tales of Zorro anthology of 17 short stories written by 22 authors, edited by Richard Dean Starr 2008 Moonstone Books ISBN 978-1-933076-31-7
- Zorro and the Little Devil by Peter David 2018 Bold Venture Press ISBN 978-1-7193-7410-1
- Zorro: The Daring Escapades anthology of 16 short stories, edited by Audrey Parente and Daryl McCullough 2020 Bold Venture Press ISBN 979-8637608508.

=== Films ===
The character has been adapted for over forty films. They include:

==== American feature films ====
Original theatrical feature films:

- The Mark of Zorro (1920), with Douglas Fairbanks, directed by Fred Niblo
- Don Q, Son of Zorro (1925), with Douglas Fairbanks, directed by Donald Crisp
- The Bold Caballero (1936), with Robert Livingston, directed by Wells Root
- The Mark of Zorro (1940), with Tyrone Power, directed by Rouben Mamoulian
- The Erotic Adventures of Zorro (1972), an erotic parody of the masked avenger, co-produced in Italy and Germany, with Douglas Frey, directed by Robert Freeman
- Zorro, The Gay Blade (1981), a parody directed by Peter Medak with George Hamilton as Diego Jr. and his twin brother Ramon. Diego Jr. succeeds his late father as Zorro, but he soon breaks his leg, and Ramon fills in while Diego Jr. recuperates.
- The Mask of Zorro (1998), directed by Martin Campbell with Anthony Hopkins as an aged Don Diego de la Vega and Antonio Banderas as Alejandro Murrieta, a misfit outlaw/cowboy who is trained to become the next Zorro, with Alejandro eventually marrying Diego's daughter Elena (Catherine Zeta-Jones)
- The Legend of Zorro (2005), the sequel to 1998's The Mask of Zorro, again starring Antonio Banderas and Catherine Zeta-Jones, and directed by Martin Campbell
- Brian Helgeland is set to pen Django/Zorro, loosely based on the comic book of the same name.
- Filmmaker Joe Begos is set to write and direct They Call Him Zorro, a darker take on the character in the vein of a horror film. Set in present day Los Angeles, the plot will follow escaped inmate Diego Vega as he becomes a violent vigilante seeking vengeance on the corrupt bureaucrats who framed him.

Compilation theatrical feature films:

- The Sign of Zorro (1958), with Guy Williams, portions of the first 13 Zorro TV episodes edited into a feature film, released overseas in 1958 and domestically in 1960
- Zorro, the Avenger (1959), with Guy Williams, a second theatrical compilation film Zorro TV episodes, exclusively released overseas.*

TV films:

- The Mark of Zorro (1974), a made-for-television movie, which is a remake of the 1940 film, with Frank Langella as Zorro, directed by Don McDougall

==== American film serials ====
- Zorro Rides Again (1937), with John Carroll as a modern-day descendant, James Vega
- Zorro's Fighting Legion (1939), with Reed Hadley as the original Zorro/Don Diego de la Vega
- Son of Zorro (1947), with George Turner as a Civil War descendant, Jeff Stewart
- Ghost of Zorro (1949), with Clayton Moore as Ken Mason, Zorro's grandson/"The Ghost of Zorro"

Despite the title and a credit to McCulley, Zorro's Black Whip (1944), with Linda Stirling as an 1880s masked avenger known as The Black Whip, has nothing to do with Zorro.

==== Mexican films ====
- El nieto del Zorro (1948) Mexican Western with Adalberto "Resortes" Martínez
- El Zorro escarlata en la venganza del ahorcado (1959), Mexican Western with Luis Aguilar
- El regreso del monstruo (1959), Mexican Western with Luis Aguilar
- El Zorro escarlata en diligencia fantasma (1959), Mexican Western with Luis Aguilar
- El correo del norte (1960), Mexican Western with Luis Aguilar
- La máscara de la muerte (1961), Mexican Western with Luis Aguilar
- La trampa mortal (1962), Mexican Western with Luis Aguilar
- La venganza de la Sombra (1962), Mexican Western with Luis Aguilar
- El Zorro Vengador (1962), Mexican Western with Luis Aguilar
- La gran aventura del Zorro (1976), Mexican Western with Rodolfo de Anda, set in a very primitive San Francisco Bay Area.

==== European films ====
- In the Way of Zorro — French: À la manière de Zorro (1926) Belgium William Elie – Unofficial
- The Dream of Zorro (also known as Zorro's Dream) — Italian: Il sogno di Zorro (1952) Italy Walter Chiari
- Lawless Mountain — Spanish: La montaña sin ley (1953) Spain José Suárez
- Zorro at the Spanish Court — Italian: Zorro alla corte di Spagna (1962) Italy George Ardisson
- Zorro the Avenger — Italian: Zorro il vendicatore (also known as Italian: La venganza del Zorro) (1962) Spain & Italy Frank Latimore
- The Shadow of Zorro — Spanish: L'ombra di Zorro (also known as Spanish: Cabalgando hacia la muerte) (1962) Spain & Italy Frank Latimore
- The Three Swords of Zorro — Italian: Le tre spade di Zorro (1963) Spain & Italy Guy Stockwell
- Zorro and the Three Musketeers — Italian: Zorro e i tre moschettieri (1963) Italy Gordon Scott
- Samson and the Slave Queen — Italian: Zorro contro Maciste (1963) Italy & Spain Pierre Brice
- Duel at the Rio Grande (also known as Sign of Zorro) — Italian: Il segno di Zorro (1963) Spain, Italy & France Sean Flynn
- Behind the Mask of Zorro — Italian: El Zorro cabalga otra vez (1965) Italy & Spain Tony Russel
- Zorro the Rebel — Italian: Zorro il ribelle (1966) Italy Howard Ross
- Zorro the Fox (also known as La Volpe) — Italian: El Zorro (La Volpe) (1968) Italy & Spain George Ardisson
- The Nephews of Zorro — Italian: I nipoti di Zorro (1968) Italy, comedy with Franco and Ciccio as Franco La Vacca and Ciccio La Vacca, nephews of Don Diego de la Vega's late wife. Dean Reed plays Raphael de la Vega, son of Don Diego and the new Zorro, while Franco Fantasia plays an aged Don Diego, who has retired from being Zorro.
- Zorro, the Navarra Marquis — Italian: Zorro marchese di Navarra (1969) Italy Nadir Moretti
- Zorro in the Court of England — Italian: Zorro alla corte d'Inghilterra (1969) Italy Spiros Focás
- The Avenger, Zorro — Italian: El Zorro justiciero (also known as Italian: E continuavano a chiamarlo figlio di ... (1969) Italy & Spain Fabio Testi
- Zorro's Latest Adventure — Italian: Zorro il dominatore (1969) Spain & Italy Carlos Quiney
- Zorro, Rider of Vengeance — Italian: Zorro, il cavaliere della vendetta (1971) Spain & Italy Carlos Quiney
- Zorro the Invincible — Spanish: El Zorro de Monterrey (1971) Spain & Italy Carlos Quiney
- Red Hot Zorro — French: Les aventures galantes de Zorro (1972) France & Belgium Jean-Michel Dhermay
- Man with the Golden Winchester — Italian: Il figlio di Zorro (1973) Italy & Spain Alberto Dell'Acqua
- Grandsons of Zorro (also known as Dream of Zorro) — French: Les aventures galantes de Zorro (1975) Italy Franco Franchi
- Zorro (1975) Italy & France Alain Delon
- The Mark of Zorro — French: La marque de Zorro (1975) France; additional sequences added to Zorro the avenger (1962) with Frank Latimore renamed Clint Douglas
- Mark of Zorro (also known as Who's Afraid of Zorro and They Call Him Zorro ... Is He?) — French: Ah sì? E io lo dico a Zzzzorro! (1975) Italy & Spain George Hilton – Unofficial

Turkey

- Zorro kamcili süvari (1969) Turkey Tamer Yiğit
- Zorro'nun intikami (1969) Turkey Tamer Yiğit

India

- Zorro (1975) India Navin Nischol

Note: Unofficial means not included in the official film list at zorro.com

Argentina

Zorro, el sentimiento de hierro (2019), fan film

=== Television series ===
American series — live-action

- Zorro, a Disney half-hour television series, running from 1957 to 1959, starring Guy Williams as Zorro for 78 episodes. The two features listed above starring Guy Williams were episode compilations, and there were four one-hour follow-ups on the Disney anthology television series in the 1960–1961 TV season.
- Zorro and Son, broadcast in 1983 for five episodes, was a situation comedy in which an aged Don Diego (Henry Darrow) trains his son Carlos (Paul Regina) to succeed him as Zorro.
- Zorro, also called The New Zorro, New World Zorro, or Zorro 1990, was a television series which starred Duncan Regehr as Zorro for 88 episodes on The Family Channel from 1990 to 1993. Two feature-length videos were episode compilations. An unaired alternate pilot episode was included in the 2011 DVD release of the series: the pilot features a different cast and story, with Don Diego dying and Don Antonio de la Cruz (Patrick James) taking up the mantle of Zorro.
- In the series finale of Once Upon a Time, "Leaving Storybrooke" (aired May 18, 2018), Zorro is said to be able to shapeshift into a dragon, and in that form, fathered Maleficent (Kristin Bauer van Straten)'s daughter, Lily (Nicole Muñoz (teen)/Agnes Bruckner (adult)). Zorro himself does not appear in the series, due to copyrights. Lily appears in the fourth season (2014-2015) episodes, "Breaking Glass", "Lily", "Mother", and "Operation Mongoose: Part 2."
- In December 2021, it was announced that a new series was in development by Disney-ABC, starring Wilmer Valderrama. Valderrama confirmed that the series would be on Disney+. In March 2023, Bryan Cogman was announced as series showrunner.
- CBS Studios is developing a "gender-swapped" update in which Zorro's daughter assumes the masked hero's role. As of 2024, the series is in the works with CBS, having previously been in development with NBC and the CW.

American series — animation

- The New Adventures of Zorro, 1981 animated series from Filmation, which consists of 13 episodes. Henry Darrow (later to star in Zorro & Son) lends his voice to the title character.
- The New Adventures of Zorro, 1997–1998 animated series from Fred Wolf Films, which consists of 26 episodes.
- The Amazing Zorro, 2002 made for TV animated film created by DIC Entertainment as part of their DIC Movie Toons lineup. It premiered on Nickelodeon and was later released on DVD and VHS shortly afterward by MGM Home Entertainment.
- Zorro: Generation Z, 2006 animated series from BKN International which consists of 26 episodes. It follows a descendant of the original Zorro, also named Diego De La Vega, fighting crime and the corrupt government of Pueblo Grande in a future setting.

International series

- Kaiketsu Zorro, (1996–1997) Japanese anime version from NHK and Ashi Productions, which consists of 52 episodes.
- El Zorro, la espada y la rosa (The Sword and the Rose), a 2007 Spanish language telenovela from Sony Pictures and Telemundo, starring Christian Meier as Don Diego de la Vega/Zorro. It consists of 112 episodes.
- Zorro, a 2009 TV series from the GMA Network of the Philippines, starring Richard Gutierrez. It consists of 98 episodes.
- Zorro: The Chronicles, a French animated series (2015), voiced by Johnny Yong Bosch
- Zorro, a 2024 Spanish TV series produced by Secuoya Studios for Amazon Prime, starring Miguel Bernardeau. It consists of ten episodes.
- Zorro, a French TV series starring Jean Dujardin. It was broadcast by Paramount+ and consists of eight episodes.
- Dubrovsky. The Russian Zorro, the first Russian series, which reinterprets the Zorro story as a sequel to Alexander Pushkin's novel "Dubrovsky". It is being released on Amediateka since 30 September 2026.

=== Audio/radio dramas ===
- Walt Disney's Zorro: [1. Presenting Señor Zorro; 2. Zorro Frees The Indians; 3. Zorro And The Ghost; 4. Zorro's Daring Rescue] (1957) released by Disneyland Records. This album retold stories from the Disney Zorro television series. It featured Guy Williams as Zorro and Don Diego, Henry Calvin as Sergeant Garcia, Phil Ross as Monastario, Jan Arvan as Torres, Jimmie Dodd from The Mickey Mouse Club as Padre Felipe, with other voices by Dallas McKennon and sound effects by Jimmy MacDonald and Eddie Forrest. Record story adaptations by Bob Thomas and George Sherman. Music composed and conducted by William Lava.
- The Adventures of Zorro. (1957) Based on the original Johnston McCulley story The Curse of Capistrano (aka The Mark of Zorro). It was written by Maria Little, directed by Robert M. Light, and produced by Mitchell Gertz. This short-lived radio show was a series of short episodes. Only a handful of episodes are known to have survived.
- The Mark of Zorro. (1997) [No longer available] Produced by the BBC, it starred Mark Arden as Zorro, Louise Lombard as Lolita, and Glyn Houston as Friar Felipe. It aired in 5 parts. 1. July 3, 1997 Night of the Fox: 2. July 10, 1997 Deadly Reckonings: 3. July 17, 97 The Avenging Blade 4. July 24, 1997 The Place of Skulls 5. July 31, 1997 The Gathering Storm
- Zorro and the Pirate Raiders. (2009) Based on the D.J. Arneson adaptation of Johnston McCulley's The Further Adventures of Zorro. Produced by Colonial Radio Theatre on the Air. Published by Brilliance Audio. It features Kevin Cirone, Shonna McEachern, Hugh Metzler, J.T. Turner, Sam Donato, Joseph Zamperelli Jr., and Dan Powell.
- Zorro Rides Again. (2011) Based on the D.J. Arneson adaptation of Johnston McCulley's "Zorro Rides Again". Produced by Colonial Theatre on the Air. It features the voice talents of Kevin Cirone, Jeremy Benson, Shonna McEachern, Shana Dirk, Sam Donato, and Hugh Metzler.
- The Mark of Zorro. (2011) Based on The Curse of Capistrano. Produced by Yuri Rasovsky (Hollywood Theater of the Ear) for Blackstone Audio. It features the voice talents of Val Kilmer as Diego de la Vega/Zorro, Ruth Livier as Lolita Pulido, Elizabeth Peña as Doña Catalina Pulido, Armin Shimerman as the Landlord, Mishach Taylor as Sgt Pedro Gonzalez, Keith Szarabajka as Cpt Ramone, Ned Schmidtke as Don Carlos Pulido, Scott Brick as the Governor, Stefan Rudnicki as Fray Felipe, Kristoffer Tabori as Don Alejando de la Vega, Philip Proctor as Don Audre, John Sloan as the Magistrado, and Gordo Panza in numerous roles.
- The Legacy of Zorro. (2026) A continuation of the Antonio Banderas films, produced by Big Finish Productions. Martin Marquez stars as Alejandro Murrieta/Zorro.

=== Toys ===
Due to the popularity of the Disney TV series, in 1958, The Topps Company produced an 88-card set featuring stills from that year's movie. The cards were rare and became collector's items. In the same year, the Louis Marx company released a variety of Zorro toys, such as hats, swords, toy pistols, and a playset, with the Lido company also making plastic figures.

A major toy line based on the classic Zorro characters, motifs, and styling was released by Italian toy giant Giochi Preziosi, master toy licensees of the property. The toy range was developed by Pangea Corporation and released worldwide in 2005. It featured action figures in various scales, interactive playsets, and roleplaying items. New original characters were also introduced, including Senor Muerte, who served as a foil to Zorro.

In 2007, Brazilian toymaker Gulliver Toys licensed the rights to Zorro: Generation Z, which was co-developed by BKN and Pangea Corporation. The toy range was designed concurrently and in association with the animated program.

In 2011, US-based collectibles company Triad Toys released a 12-inch Zorro action figure.

=== Comics ===
Zorro #01, 2008, by Dynamite Entertainment

Zorro has appeared in many different comic book series over the decades. Zorro was adapted into comics in France in 1939 in Jumbo. Its best-known artists were André Oulié (1947–1967), Eu. Gire (1949).

In Hit Comics #55, published by Quality Comics in November 1948, Zorro is summoned by Kid Eternity, but in this version has only a whip and does not wear a mask.

Dell Comics published Zorro in Four Color Comics #228 (1949), 425 (1952), 497 (1953), 538 (1954), 574 (1954), 617 (1955) and 732 (1957). These stories featured artwork by Everett Raymond Kinstler (#497, 538, and 574), Bob Fujitani, Bob Correa and Alberto Giolitti.

Dell also had a license to publish Disney comics in the United States and, following the launch of Disney's Zorro TV series in 1957, published seven more issues of Four Color dedicated to Zorro between February 1958 and September 1959, under said license, with the first stories featuring artwork by Alex Toth. In December 1959, Dell started the publication of a standalone Disney-licensed Zorro title, which started the numeration at #8 and continued to be published until issue #15 (September 1961). The character then appeared in four stories published in the monthly Walt Disney's Comics and Stories (also published by Dell), one story per issue from #275 (August 1963) to #278 (November 1963): these were the last Zorro stories produced in the United States under the Disney license. However, Disney produced more stories from 1964 to 1978 through the Disney Studio Program, a unit producing comic book stories exclusively for foreign consumption. In addition to publishing translations of American stories and Disney Studio stories, many foreign publishers also produced their own original stories under the Disney licence: these countries are the Netherlands (1964–1967), Chile (1965–1974), Italy (1969–1971), Brazil (1973–1983), France (1974–1986), and Germany (1980–1982).

From 1964 to 1967, Hans Kresse (art) and Joop Termos (script) offered unpublished stories to the readers of the Dutch youth weekly Pep.

Gold Key Comics started another Disney-licensed Zorro series in January 1966, but, like their contemporaneous Lone Ranger series, it featured only material reprinted from the earlier Dell comics and folded after nine issues in March 1968. The character remained dormant in the United States for the next twenty years until it was revived by Marvel Comics in 1990 for a 12-issue tie-in with the Duncan Regehr television series Zorro. Many of these comics had Alex Toth covers.

In 1993, Topps Comics published a 2-issue limited series Dracula Versus Zorro followed by a Zorro series that ran 11 issues. Topps also published two limited series of Lady Rawhide, a spin-off from the Zorro stories created by writer Don McGregor and artist Mike Mayhew. McGregor subsequently scripted a limited series adaptation of The Mask of Zorro film for Image Comics.

A newspaper daily and Sunday strip were also published in the late 1990s. This was written by McGregor and rendered by Thomas Yeates. Papercutz once published a Zorro series and graphic novels. This version is drawn in a manga style.

Dynamite Entertainment relaunched the character with a 20-issue Zorro series which ran from 2008 to 2010, written by Matt Wagner and drawn by multiple artists. The publisher also released an earlier unpublished tale called "Matanzas" by Don McGregor and artist Mike Mayhew. Zorro (here a 1930s descendant) also appears in the 2013 Dynamite eight-issue limited series Masks alongside the Green Hornet and Kato, The Shadow, and The Spider. It was written by Chris Roberson with art by Alex Ross and Dennis Calero.

Dynamite Entertainment also published a seven-issue series titled Django/Zorro between November 2014 and May 2015, teaming Zorro with the character Django Freeman from Quentin Tarantino's movie Django Unchained (2012). The series was co-written by Tarantino and Matt Wagner, with art by Esteve Polls.

In 2018, American Mythology took the license, launched the series Zorro Legendary Adventures, written by Jean-Marie Nadaud and drawn by Robert Rigot and limited series Zorro: Swords of Hell, written by David Avallone and illustrated by Roy Allan Martinez. The company has since released crossovers featuring Zorro with their other licensed properties, namely Zorro in the Land that Time Forgot featuring Diego De La Vega accompanying an expedition to the lost world of Caspak from the Edgar Rice Burroughs novels.

In 2020, the French publisher Dargaud launched Don Vega by Pierre Alary.

In 2023, it was announced that Sean Gordon Murphy would write and illustrate a four-issue miniseries for Massive Publishing entitled Zorro: Man of the Dead, set for release in 2024.

==== Collected editions ====
Over the years, various English reprint volumes have been published. These include, but are not limited to:

- Zorro in Old California, Eclipse Books 1986. ISBN 978-0-913035-12-2 Reprinted stories previously published only in Europe, in Le Journal de Mickey.
- Zorro The Complete Classic Adventures By Alex Toth. Volume One, Image Comics 1998. ISBN 9781582400143
- Zorro The Complete Classic Adventures By Alex Toth. Volume Two, Image Comics 1998. ISBN 978-1582400273
- Zorro The Dailies – The First Year By Don McGregor, Thomas Yeates. Image Comics 2001. ISBN 1-58240-239-6
- Alex Toth's Zorro: The Complete Dell Comics Adventures. Hermes Press 2013. ISBN 978-1613450314
- Zorro: The Complete Dell Pre-Code Comics. Hermes Press 2014. ISBN 9781613450666

=== Stage productions ===
Approximately 65 separate Zorro live productions have been produced. These have included traditional stage plays, comedies, melodramas, musicals, children's plays, stunt shows, and ballets. Some examples include:

- Ken Hill wrote and directed the musical production of Zorro, which opened on February 14, 1995, at the East Stratford Theater in London. Ken Hill died just days before the opening.
- Alvaro Cervino produced a musical comedy, "Zorro El Musical", in Mexico City, Mexico, in July 1996. Critics called it "a show that captivates audiences both by its performances and above all, by its magnificent musical numbers".
- Michael Nelson wrote a stage adaptation of Zorro for the Birmingham Children's Theater in 1996. Beaufort County Now called it "a fun and fast paced production perfect for children 6 and up." Abe Reybold directed with scenic design by Yoshi Tanokura and costume designs by Donna Meester. Jay Tumminello provided an original score.
- Theater Under the Stars in Houston, Texas, put on Zorro, the Musical as an opera in 1998. It was written and directed by Frank Young and starred Richard White as Zorro.
- Z – The Masked Musical by Robert W. Cabell was released in 1998 as a CD. The CD premiere with Ruben Gomez (Zorro) and Debbie Gibson (Carlotta) is published as a CD. In 2000, the stage play premiered at the South Eugene High School in Eugene, Oregon, where it had four performances by the amateur group ACE. It was then produced on June 13, 2013, at the Clingenburg Festspiele in Klingenberg am Main, Bavaria, Germany, with Karl Grunewald and Philip Georgopoulos as alternating Zorros, Judith Perez as Carlotta, Daniel Coninx as Governor Juan Carlos, Daniel Pabst as Capitàn Raphaél Ramerez and Christian Theodoridis as Sergeant Santiago Garcia. This production was directed by Marcel Krohn and premiered in the composer's presence.
- In 1999, Anthony Rhine and Joseph Henson wrote Zorro Live!, which was performed at the Riverside Light Opera theater.
- In 2000, Fernando Lúpiz produced his first original "Zorro" show. It was such a crowd-pleaser that he mounted a new production thereafter almost annually until 2014. His productions were performed most frequently in arenas, featuring live horses, rousing swordplay, and songs.
- In 2001, the Gaslight Theatre of Tucson, Arizona, reprised its 1994 spoof called "Zerro Rides Again" or "No Arrest for the Wicked". It was described as "full of silly wigs, ridiculous situations, songs that barely fit in, and dialogue so fat with wordplay that it's tough not to love it. 'Zerro' is a chance to laugh yourself silly. Seize it".
- In 2002, playwright Michael Harris wrote The Legend of Zorro, which has been performed in many high schools.
- In 2002, Luis Alvarez produced his El Zorro El Spectaculo at the Teatro Calderon in Madrid, Spain. Critics lauded it, saying, "Manuel Bandera makes the ideal Zorro. We hope he has the stamina necessary to endure the long run this play deserves."
- Michael Smuin's critically lauded modern ballet version of Zorro premiered in the Yerba Buena Center for the Arts in San Francisco in 2003. Composer Charles Fox provided the score, and Matthew Robbins wrote the libretto. Ann Beck was the costume designer, and Douglas W. Schmidt was the set designer. Smuin himself choreographed with Fight Director Emeritus Richard Lane as Fencing Master.
- Culture Clash's Zorro in Hell opened in 2005 in the Berkeley Repertory Theater, then in 2006 in the La Jolla Playhouse and the Montalban Theater in Los Angeles. Zorro In Hell was written and performed by Richard Montoya, Ric Salinas, and Herbert Siguenza. Culture Clash used the legend of Zorro as a lens to examine California's cultural, economic, and historical issues. The LA Times called it "a zany bicultural send-up of California history."
- Award-winning playwright Bernardo Solano wrote a modern adaptation of Zorro for TheatreWorks at the University of Colorado in 2007. Robert Castro directed, and Justin Huen starred as Zorro. The Denver Post called the production "a fresh take" and "a formula other companies should emulate."
- In Uppsala, Sweden, Erik Norberg wrote a Zorro stage adaptation for the Stadsteatern Theatre, directed by Alexander Oberg, starring Danilo Bejarano as Zorro. The production opened in 2008.
- A musical titled Zorro opened in the West End of London in 2008. It was written by Helen Edmundson and Stephen Clark, with music by the Gipsy Kings and John Cameron, and directed by Christopher Renshaw. It was nominated for 5 Oliviers, including Best Musical. It has since enjoyed professional productions in Tokyo, Paris, Amsterdam, Moscow, Prague, Warsaw, Tel Aviv, Seoul, Shanghai, São Paulo and elsewhere. The US premiere production took place in 2012 at Hale Centre Theatre in Salt Lake City, Utah, with a further production at the Alliance Theater in Atlanta, Georgia, where it won five awards, including Best Musical.
- The Scottish children's theater troupe Visible Fictions put on a touring production of The Mask of Zorro in 2009. Davey Anderson wrote the script, and Douglas Irvine directed it. Robin Peoples designed the sets, which The New York Times called "a triumph."
- Lifehouse Theater, a Redlands, California-based company, put on Zorro, written and scored by Wayne Scott. Zorro opened in 2009.
- In 2012, Janet Allard and Eleanor Holdridge produced and directed Zorro at the Constellation Theatre in Washington, D.C. Holdridge directed, and Danny Gavigan played Zorro. The Washington Post said of the production, "Constellation augments its classical thrust in a thoughtful way with 'Zorro,' which continues the company's laudable efforts at delivering intimate theater with high standards for design."
- In 2012, Medina Produzioni, based in Rome, Italy, produced its musical, "W Zorro il Musical – liberamente ispirato alla storia di William Lamport" in numerous theatres throughout Italy.
- The Oregon-based ballet troupe Ballet Fantastique produced Zorro: The Ballet as an opener to their 2013 season. Eugene Weekly called the ballet a "zesty, fresh, fantastic treat."
- Elenco Produções produced its musical, "Zorro", in Porto, Portugal, in 2013.

=== Music ===
On the commercial release of the Zorro 1957 Disney TV series' Zorro theme, the lead vocal was by Henry Calvin, the actor who played Sergeant Garcia on the program. The song was written by Jimmie Dodd.

The Chordettes sang the single version of the song, complete with the "Sounds of the Z" and the clip-clopping of Zorro's horse, which is heard at the song's end. The song hit Number 17 in 1958, according to the Billboard Charts.

In 1964, Henri Salvador sang "Zorro est arrivé." It tells from a child's point of view how exciting it is whenever a villain threatens to kill a lady in the television series. But every time again, to his relief, the "great and beautiful" Zorro comes to the rescue. An early music video was made at the time.

Alice Cooper's 1982 album Zipper Catches Skin includes the song "Zorro's Ascent", which is about Zorro facing his death.

The 1999 song "El Corona" by Suburban Legends tells the story of "Don Diego", the "hombre en negro" ("man in black"), a "tall Spaniard with a sharp sword" who was "down and out in LA" and defending the people from an unnamed corrupt ruler.

=== Video games ===
- Zorro (1985), Apple II, Atari 8-bit computers, Commodore 64, Amstrad CPC
- Zorro (1986), ZX Spectrum
- Zorro (1995), MS-DOS
- The Mask of Zorro (1999), Game Boy Color
- The Shadow of Zorro (2001), Microsoft Windows, PlayStation 2
- The Destiny of Zorro (2008), Wii
- Zorro: Quest for Justice (2009), Nintendo DS
- There is a Zorro-themed poker machine at gaming establishments in Australia and New Zealand.
- Zorro is Morgana's Persona in Persona 5 (2017) and its revised version, Persona 5 Royal. In the latter, Diego, the real identity of the character, manifests as Morgana's third awakening Persona during the game's third semester.
- In the 2017 mobile app South Park: Phone Destroyer, the card Swordsman Garrison sees Mr. Garrison dressed up as Zorro.
- Zorro appears as a paid DLC Guest Fighter in Go All Out!, Microsoft Windows,
- Zorro: The Chronicles (2022), Microsoft Windows, Xbox, Nintendo Switch, PlayStation

=== Role-playing games ===
- In July 2001, the Gold Rush Games published The Legacy of Zorro Introductory Adventure Game (ISBN 1-890305-26-X) by Mark Arsenault for Fuzion.
- In January 2019, Gallant Knight Games used crowdfunding platform Kickstarter to finance the game Zorro: The Roleplaying Game for the D6 System.

== See also ==
- Gentleman thief

== Bibliography ==
- Andes, Stephen Joseph Carl (2020). Zorro's Shadow: How a Mexican Legend Became America's First Superhero. Chicago Review Press.
- Andrae, Thomas (1983). Creators Of The Superheroes. Hermes Press. ISBN 978-193256326-9.
- Curtis, Sandra (1998). Zorro Unmasked: The Official History. Hyperion. ISBN 978-0-7868-8285-4.
- Yenne, Bill (1991). The Legend of Zorro. Mallard Press. ISBN 978-0-7924-5547-9.
