= The Curse of Capistrano =

1919 novel by Johnston McCulley

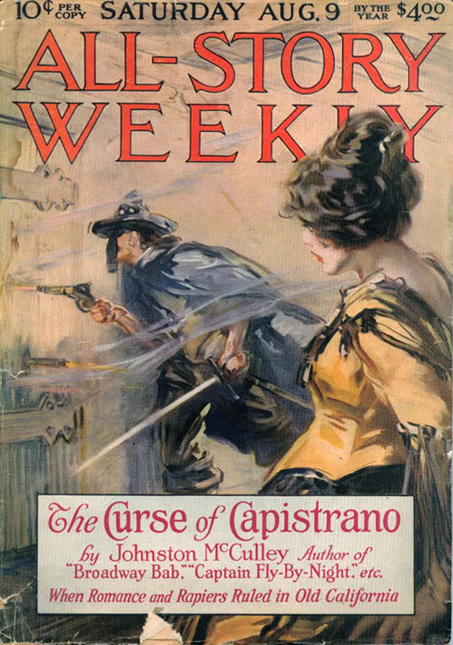
- Author: Johnston McCulley
- Language: English
- Series: Weekly: August 9 – September 6, 1919
- Genre: Adventure
- Publisher: All-Story Weekly; Grosset & Dunlap
- Publication date: 1919
- Publication place: United States
- Media type: Print (Serial, Hardback & Paperback)
- Pages: 300
- OCLC: 1729949

The Curse of Capistrano is a 1919 novel by Johnston McCulley and the first work to feature the masked hero Zorro. (Note: "Zorro" is the Spanish word for fox.) It first appeared as a five-part magazine serial. The story was adapted into the silent film The Mark of Zorro in 1920. It appeared in book form in 1924, also using the title The Mark of Zorro.

== Publication history ==
Before being published in book form, The Curse of Capistrano appeared as five serialized installments in the pulp magazine All-Story Weekly. In 1920, the story was adapted as the silent film The Mark of Zorro starring Douglas Fairbanks as the hero Don Diego Vega. The title was a reference to the hero's habit of marking enemies or surfaces with three sword cuts, forming a letter "Z."

The film met with enormous success, leading to public demand for more Zorro stories. In 1922, McCulley began a new series of over 60 serialized stories in Argosy All-Story Weekly. Many of these stories were later collected and published as The Further Adventures of Zorro, Zorro Rides Again, and The Sign of Zorro.

Taking advantage of the character's rising popularity in film and prose, and not wishing to confuse interested buyers by using the original title, the five-part prose story was then republished as a novel entitled The Mark of Zorro by Grosset & Dunlap in 1924. Since then, each new edition of the book has been published under the same title. Twenty years after the first film adaptation and sixteen years after the book's publication, 20th Century Fox released a new "talkie" version of The Mark of Zorro in 1940 starring Tyrone Power as Don Diego Vega. The film met with high popularity and critical success and was named to the National Film Registry in 2009 by the Library of Congress for being "culturally, historically or aesthetically significant," and to be preserved for all time. The 1940 film has been referenced in numerous Batman comics as the film that hero Bruce Wayne sees on the night his parents are murdered.

== Setting ==
The book tells of the story of Californio Don Diego Vega, alias "Señor Zorro", in the company of his deaf and mute servant Bernardo and his lover Lolita Pulido, as they oppose the villainous Captain Ramon and Sgt. Gonzales in early 19th-century California during the era of Mexican rule, before it became a U.S. state. (Note: See Alta California) It is set amongst the historic Spanish missions in California, pueblos (towns) such as San Juan Capistrano, California, and the rural California countryside. (Note: See also ranchos of California)
