= Peperomia vazquezii =

Scientific classification
- Kingdom: Plantae
- Clade: Tracheophytes
- Clade: Angiosperms
- Clade: Magnoliids
- Order: Piperales
- Family: Piperaceae
- Genus: Peperomia
- Species: P. vazquezii

Binomial name
- Peperomia vazquezii G.Mathieu & Verg.-Rodr.

Species of lithophyte

Peperomia vazquezii is a species of perennial and lithophyte from the genus 'Peperomia'. It grows in wet tropical biomes. It was discovered by Guido Mathieu and Daniela Vergara-Rodríguez in 2010.

== Etymology ==
vazquezii from the surname of José Antonio Vázquez-García. José Antonio Vázquez-García is a Mexican botanist that discovered plants like Magnolia pacifica, Magnolia iltisiana and Magnolia panamensis.

== Distribution ==
Peperomia vazquezii is native to Mexico. Specimens can be found at an elevation of 150-200 meters.

- Mexico
  - Veracruz
    - Uxpanapa
