= Sierra de Álamos–Río Cuchujaqui Flora and Fauna Protection Area =

Biosphere reserve in Mexico

- Sierra de Álamos–Río Cuchujaqui Biosphere Reserve
- IUCN category VI (protected area with sustainable use of natural resources)
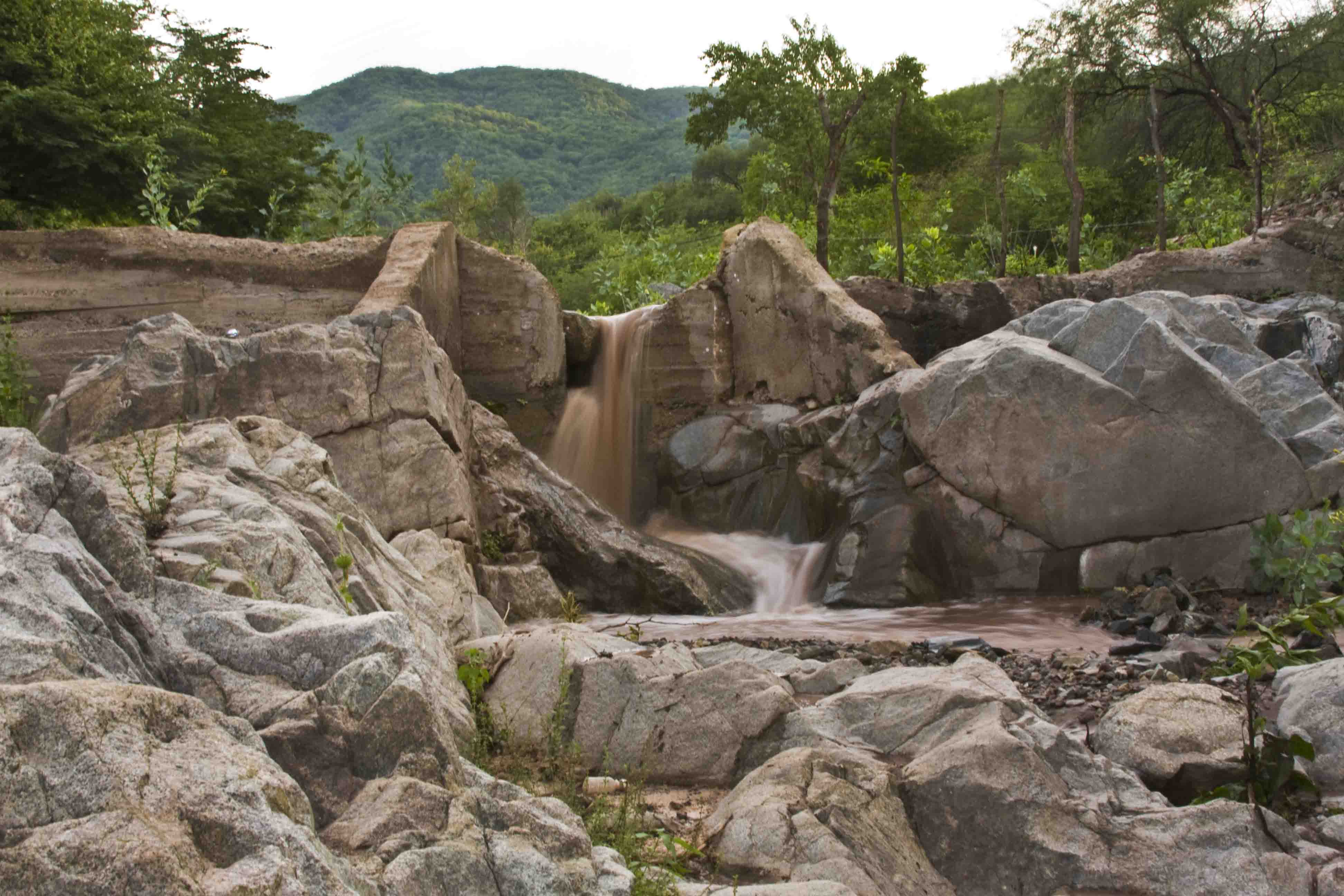
- stream near Aduana, Álamos, Sonora

- Location within Mexico
- Location: Sonora, Mexico
- Nearest city: Álamos, Sonora
- Coordinates: 27°00′25.4″N 108°46′25.8″W
- Area: 92,890 ha (358.7 sq mi)
- Designated: 1996
- Administrator: National Commission of Natural Protected Areas

Ramsar Wetland
- Official name: Ecosistema Arroyo Verde APFF Sierra de Álamos Río Cuchujaqui
- Designated: 2 February 2010
- Reference no.: 1934

The Sierra de Álamos–Río Cuchujaqui Flora and Fauna Protection Area, also known as the Sierra de Álamos–Río Cuchujaqui Biosphere Reserve, is a protected area and biosphere reserve in western Mexico. It is located in southeastern Sonora state, along the boundary with Sinaloa and Chihuahua states.

== Geography ==
The reserve covers an area of 928.9 km^{2}. It includes the Sierra de Álamos and the basin of the Cuchujaqui River, a tributary of the Fuerte River. The town of Álamos lies at the northern edge of the reserve.

The Sierra de Álamos is a western outlier of the Sierra Madre Occidental, and the reserve spans the transition from the Sierra to the western coastal plain which lies between the Sierra and the Pacific Ocean.

Average rain is 712 mm per year, 80% of that rain is during the rainy season, from June to October.

== Biodiversity ==
The protected area includes a variety of plant communities, from lowland tropical dry deciduous forest and thorn scrub in the lowlands to evergreen pine–oak forest at higher elevation. Riparian forests of Taxodium mucronatum grow along the rivers and streams. The lowland dry forests and thorn scrub are at the northern extent of the Sinaloan dry forests ecoregion, and the area includes the northernmost range of many tropical species, as well as species characteristic of the Sonoran-Sinaloan transition subtropical dry forest.

The reserve is home to many species of plants, with approximately 1,200 species in 566 genera and 148 families. Native plants include Guaiacum coulteri, Magnolia tarahumara, Brahea aculeata palms, and the cycad Dioon sonorense.

There are 557 species of vertebrates in the reserve. Native mammals include the puma (Puma concolor), jaguar (Panthera onca), ocelot (Leopardus pardalis), jaguarundi (Herpailurus yaguaroundi), and neotropical otter (Lontra longicaudis). Native birds include golden eagle (Aquila chrysaetos), great blue heron (Ardea herodias), violet-crowned hummingbird (Leucolia violiceps), eared quetzal (Euptilotis neoxenus), and military macaw (Ara militaris). The reserve is a stopover for migratory birds like the Cooper's hawk (Accipiter cooperii) and willow flycatcher (Empidonax traillii). Native reptiles include the Gila monster (Heloderma suspectum), Río Fuerte beaded lizard (Heloderma exasperatum), and Alamos mud turtle (Kinosternon alamosae).

The Cuchujaqui River and its tributary streams are home to aquatic animals and plants including the Alamos mud turtle and freshwater shrimp (Macrobrachium sp.).

== Protection ==
The area was designated a flora and fauna protection area by the Mexican government in 1996. It was designated a biosphere reserve by UNESCO in 2007.

In 2010 three streams in the reserve were designated a Ramsar site (wetland of international importance) called "Ecosistema Arroyo Verde APFF Sierra de Álamos Río Cuchujaqui", which covers an area of 174 ha.

Various economic activities take place in and around the reserve, including open-range cattle raising, subsistence agriculture, fishing, and forestry. There are initiatives to engage local people in activities related to the conserving both nature and local culture, including community tour operators and eco-tourism, crafts, beekeeping, organic agriculture, and growing local heirloom varieties of corn (known as 'maiz criollo').
