= Rio Cuchujaqui =

River in Mexico

Rio Cuchujaqui, Arroyo Cuchujaqui or Arroyo de Alamos, is a tributary river of the Fuerte River, in the Álamos Municipality of Sonora and in El Fuerte Municipality, Sinaloa, Mexico. It has its source in the Sierra de Álamos a range in the Sierra Madre Occidental in the Álamos Municipality of Sonora. Its mouth is at its confluence with the Fuerte River, just below Tehueco in Sinaloa. Its course is interrupted in Sinaloa by the Josefa Ortiz de Domínguez dam and its reservoir at 26°25′50″N 108°42′24″W built between 1964 and 1970.

Much of the river's course lies in the Sierra de Álamos–Río Cuchujaqui Biosphere Reserve.
