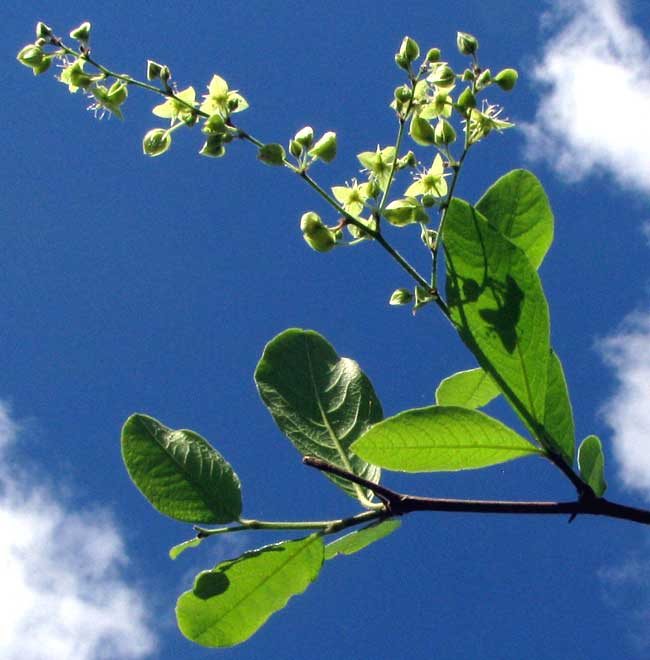
- Fragrant flowers on leafy branch

Conservation status
- Least Concern (IUCN 3.1)

Scientific classification
- Kingdom: Plantae
- Clade: Tracheophytes
- Clade: Angiosperms
- Clade: Eudicots
- Order: Caryophyllales
- Family: Polygonaceae
- Genus: Gymnopodium
- Species: G. floribundum

Binomial name
- Gymnopodium floribundum Rolfe

= Gymnopodium floribundum =

Species of plant

Flower

3-winged flowering clusters

Flowering branches

Gymnopodium floribundum is a species of woody plant mainly growing in tropical environments with long dry seasons. Occurring in southern Mexico and Guatemala, it belongs to the family Polygonaceae.

== Description ==
The key identification features of G. floribundum are as follows:

- They are shrubs or trees up to 7 m (23 ft) tall with gray to dark brown, fissured bark. Flexible branches are variously hairy but become hairless with age.
- Ochrea where leaves attach to stems are up to 2 mm (1/16 in) long and waste away with age.
- Leaves with petioles up to 4 mm (3/16 in) long arise singly, and sometimes 2-3 issue from small spurs along stems. Blades up to 9.5 cm × 2.5 cm (3 1/2 in × 1 in) have margins with no teeth or indentations, while the tips are blunt to rounded or even notched.
- Inflorescences consist of variously grouped racemes up to 12 cm (4 1/2 in) growing at branch tips.
- Flowers bear 9 stamens with filaments 2 mm (1/16 in) long, and a 3-cornered ovary with 3 styles and stigmas.There are 6 papery tepals which enlarge as the fruit develops. In fruit the 3 outer ones are up to 8 mm × 7 mm (5/16 in × 1/4 in) while the 3 inner ones are up to 5 cm × 1.5 cm (2 in × 1/2 in), all with veins interconnected into a reticulating network.
- One-seeded, achene-type, 3-cornered fruits are up to 5 mm × 2 mm (3/16 in × 1/16 in), smooth, light brown, shiny, and covered by the tepals.

== Distribution ==
In southern Mexico, Gymnopodium floribundum occurs in the Yucatan Peninsula as well as in the states of Chiapas, Oaxaca, Tabasco and Veracruz. It is also found in Belize and Guatemala.

== Habitat ==
Gymnopodium floribundum occurs in dry forests and savannas from sea level up to 1,350 m (4,430 ft) in elevation.

== Ecology ==
Where slash-and-burn agriculture is practiced, Gymnopodium floribundum is known as a species able to resprout and grow rapidly after being cut and burned. This suggests that the species possesses strategies which impart fire resistance.

== Uses by humans ==
=== In traditional medicine ===
Among the Mayan people, where Gymnopodium floribundum is known as el Dzidzilché, a decoction of leaves or flowers is drunk to relieve inflammation and diverse respiratory diseases such as colds, catarrh, bronchitis and asthma. A study supports this use, reporting that chemical compounds from the plant exhibit anti-inflammatory activity in lab tests.

=== In beekeeping ===
In Mexico's Yucatan Peninsula, among the Mayan people beekeeping for honey production is important financially and culturally. Gymnopodium floribundum is regarded as one the most important species for honey production. Honey produced from its flowers is especially appreciated by Europeans, who pay a good price.

=== As livestock food ===
For goats, sheep and cattle, foliage of Gymnopodium floribundum can contribute up to 11% of their diet, while feeding trials show that up to 40% could be fed. The foliage contains fiber similar to tropical grasses, and 9-12% protein, which is more than in grass, thus making Gymnopodium floribundum a better forage than grass.

=== For its wood ===
Besides being used when building homes in rural areas, Gymnopodium floribundum wood is used for making charcoal and firewood. It is noted to maintain a fire for a relatively long time, with minimum smoke.

== Taxonomy ==
In 1901, when Robert Allen Rolfe formally described and named Gymnopodium floribundum, he noted that his type specimen was from "Manatee, pine ridges," in British Honduras, now Belize, collected by E. J. F. Campbell, his #60. During that time frame, E. J. F. Campbell was the superintendent of the Botanic Station in British Honduras. Based on other collections, such as the synonymic Millspaughia leiophylla having been collected in "Manatee Lagoon, in swampy saline ground" and the species' habitat preferences including savannas, a good bet is that the type was collected in what now called the Manatee Forest Reserve, part of the Crooked Tree Wildlife Sanctuary, not in the famous Mountain Pine Ridge area more or less coinciding with the Mountain Pine Ridge Forest Reserve. In the Crooked Tree area locals use the name "pine ridge" to designate the vast tracts of sandy, arid land with savannas, along rivers.

=== Subspecies ===
In 2026, these 3 subspecies of Gymnopodium floribundum were accepted:

- Gymnopodium floribundum subsp. floribundum
- Gymnopodium floribundum subsp. antigonoides J.J. Ancona & J.J. Ortiz-Diaz
- Gymnopodium floribundum subsp. chiapensis J.J. Ancona & J.J. Ortiz-Diaz

=== Etymology ===
The genus name Gynopodium is constructed of the Greek gymnós, meaning "naked, bare," and podion meaning "foot." The "naked feet" Robert Allen Rolfe was thinking of in 1901 when he erected the genus Gymnopodioum probably were the pedicels of flowers of species in the genus, for he remarked that the new genus was allied to Podopterus, but differed "in its wingless pedicels..." thus the pedicels were naked.

The species name floribundum is built from the Latin flōrēre, meaning "to bloom." The -bundum appears to allude to the Latin abundāre, meaning "to be rich in, abound with." "Abounding with flowers" aptly describes this species.
