= Magnolia pugana =

Conservation status
- Endangered (IUCN 3.1)

Scientific classification
- Kingdom: Plantae
- Clade: Embryophytes
- Clade: Tracheophytes
- Clade: Spermatophytes
- Clade: Angiosperms
- Clade: Magnoliids
- Order: Magnoliales
- Family: Magnoliaceae
- Genus: Magnolia
- Section: Magnolia sect. Magnolia
- Species: M. pugana

Binomial name
- Magnolia pugana (Iltis & A.Vazquez) A.Vazquez & Carvajal

Synonyms
- Magnolia pacifica subsp. pugana Iltis & A.Vazquez

Species of flowering plant

Magnolia pugana, commonly known as almacasusco, is a species of Magnolia from northern Jalisco and southern Zacatecas states in western Mexico.

== Description ==
Magnolia pugana is a medium-sized tree, growing 15 to 25 meters tall, with a trunk up to 40–80 cm in diameter.

== Range and habitat ==
Magnolia pugana is found in the valleys and canyons of the middle Río Grande de Santiago and lower reaches of the Juchipila and Verde rivers, and on the slopes of the neighboring Sierra de Morones and Sierra Fría ranges, in northern Jalisco and southern Zacatecas states. It occurs in mountainside cloud forests, and more commonly in humid ravines and riparian forests along permanent streams in dry deciduous forests, from 1,300 to 1,600 meters elevation.

It has a very restricted range, with an area of occupancy (AOO) of 114 km^{2} and an extent of occurrence of approximately 2,460 km^{2}.

== Conservation ==
The species has a restricted range and is threatened by habitat loss from deforestation and conversion of its habitat to agriculture and urbanization. Its population is decreasing, and its conservation status is assessed as Endangered.

== Systematics ==
Magnolia pugana belongs to sect. Magnolia. Other closely related species live in western Mexico and constitute the Magnolia pacifica group – Magnolia pacifica from the coast-facing mountains of Nayarit and western Jalisco, and Magnolia vallartensis from the Pacific lowlands around Puerto Vallarta. M. pugana and M. vallartensis are sometimes classed as subspecies of M. pacifica.

Vázquez-García et al. consider the eastern population of M. pugana from the Río Verde region in Zapotlanejo and Ixtlahuacán del Río municipalities north of Guadalajara, known as the Barrancae Group, to be separate species, M. granbarrancae.
