= Alamos Alliance =

Lobbying organization

- Formation: 1993; 33 years ago
- Founder: Arnold Harberger
- Type: lobbying organization, conferences
- Legal status: Foundation
- Purpose: Influencing economics and finance, and Government policies in the U.S., Canada, and some countries of Latin America and Europe, lobbying for public-private cooperation
- Headquarters: Álamos, Sonora, Mexico
- Region served: U.S., Mexico, and Canada
- Official language: English
- Chairman: Arnold Harberger
- President: Roberto Salinas-León

The Alamos Alliance is a lobbying organization consisting of a group of conservative economists linked to the Chicago Boys, which holds a three-day annual meeting, usually by mid-February, in a town named Álamos, in the Mexican state of Sonora, in northwestern Mexico.

== History ==
This organization, founded by Arnold Harberger in 1993, is mostly known for its neoliberal points of view and its impulse to business-friendly conditions and environments favorable to investments and development of the free-enterprise system.

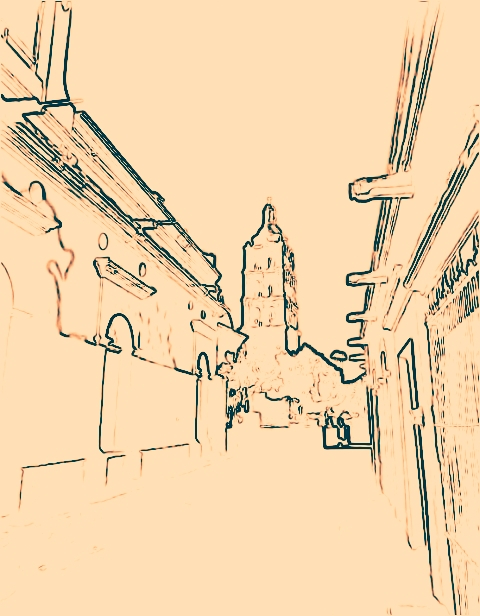
Contours of buildings at a narrow street and the tower of the Church of the Immaculate Conception, in Álamos

Its first meeting was held in February 1994 at the Hotel de los Tesoros, in Álamos ("Poplars").

For the first time, the XXVIII Alamos Alliance conference was held online, on 30 April 2021. Participants and guests joined from all over the world through a virtual platform, due to the COVID-19 pandemic. Among the participants were: Carmen Reinhart, then-Chief Economist of the World Bank; Casey B. Mulligan, professor in economics at the University of Chicago; Robin Topel; Kevin M. Murphy, professor in economics at the University of Chicago Booth School of Business and a Senior Fellow at the Hoover Institution; former Texas Senator Phil Gramm; economist Anne Krueger; Manuel Suárez Mier; Pedro Aspe, former Mexican Secretary of Finance and Public Credit; Mexican economist Manuel Sánchez; economist Tom Saving, and Chilean economist Sebastián Edwards.

The XXIX Meeting, with the title Stability, Growth, and Radical Uncertainty: Assessing Options and Opportunities, was held in San Antonio, Texas, on 10–13 March 2022. The main topics were: Session I. The Return of "Stagflation" and the Perils of Fiscal Mismanagement, Session II. The "Supply Chain Mess," Near-Shoring and the Future of Open Trade, Session III. Lost Opportunities and Radical Uncertainty in Latin America: Why?, Keynote Session. Capitalism, Prosperity, and Social Mobility.

For the XXX Meeting, held in Álamos, Sonora, on 17–19 February 2023, two of the lecturers announced were Vittorio Corbo, former Governor of the Central Bank of Chile, who spoke on inflation and interest rates, and above-mentioned Kevin M. Murphy, who spoke on social mobility and inequality.
