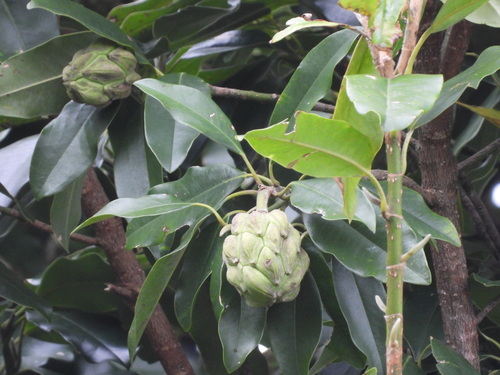

Conservation status
- Data Deficient (IUCN 3.1)

Scientific classification
- Kingdom: Plantae
- Clade: Embryophytes
- Clade: Tracheophytes
- Clade: Spermatophytes
- Clade: Angiosperms
- Clade: Magnoliids
- Order: Magnoliales
- Family: Magnoliaceae
- Genus: Magnolia
- Section: Magnolia sect. Magnolia
- Species: M. tarahumara

Binomial name
- Magnolia tarahumara (Vazquez) A.Vázquez

Synonyms
- Magnolia pacifica subsp. tarahumara Vazquez

= Magnolia tarahumara =

Species of tree

Magnolia tarahumara is a species of flowering plant in the family Magnoliaceae. It is endemic to Mexico, where it occurs in scattered locations in the Sierra Madre Occidental of southeastern Sonora, southwestern Chihuahua, Sinaloa, and northwestern Durango.

== Description ==
It is an evergreen tree with tough leaves, which are dark-green and glaucous on both surfaces. Its flowers are large and white, first appearing in March and April and peaking in May before disappearing in July. The fruit sets by March or April the following year, and falls to the ground where it can germinate with the summer monsoon. It can grow to 50 or 60 feet high, taking a slender form in the north and a generally broader-crowned form further south.

== Distribution ==
The tree is found in the Pacific (western) slope of the Sierra Madre Occidental, from 900 to 1980 meters elevation. The northernmost populations occur in scattered locations in the Sierra Saguaribo on the border of Sonora and Chihuahua, and in the Sierra de Álamos 40 miles west of the Sierra Saguaribo. In eastern Sinaloa and northwestern Durango the populations are larger and more continuous.

== Ecology ==
It grows in cool sheltered canyons with year-round moisture in the Sierra Madre Occidental pine–oak forests ecoregion. It is frequently a canopy tree within riparian oak woodland, accompanied by other broadleaved species of Clethra, Ficus, Oreopanax, Quercus, and Platanus.

The bright red seeds remain attached to the fruits as they fall to the ground, and are relished by native birds including the crested guan (Penelope purpurascens), hooded grosbeak (Hesperiphona abeillei), masked tityra (Tityra semifasciata), rufous-bellied chachalaca (Ortalis wagleri), and jays.
