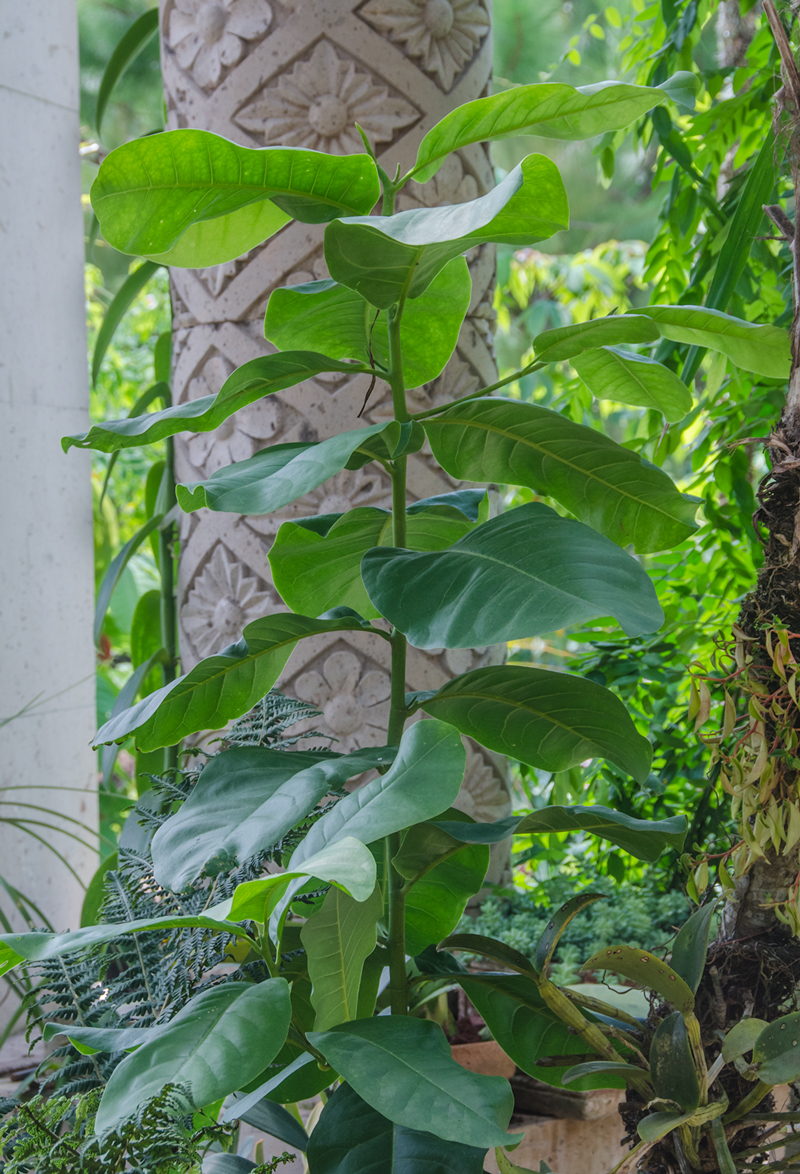
- Magnolia vallartensis at Vallarta Botanical Gardens

Conservation status
- Critically Endangered (IUCN 3.1)

Scientific classification
- Kingdom: Plantae
- Clade: Embryophytes
- Clade: Tracheophytes
- Clade: Spermatophytes
- Clade: Angiosperms
- Clade: Magnoliids
- Order: Magnoliales
- Family: Magnoliaceae
- Genus: Magnolia
- Section: Magnolia sect. Magnolia
- Species: M. vallartensis

Binomial name
- Magnolia vallartensis A.Vázquez & Muñiz-Castro

Synonyms
- Magnolia pacifica subsp. vallartensis

= Magnolia vallartensis =

Species of flowering plant

Magnolia vallartensis is a species of Magnolia from Jalisco state in western Mexico.

== Description ==
Magnolia vallartensis is a medium-sized tree, growing to about 15 meters tall.

== Range and habitat ==
Magnolia vallartensis is native to a small area of Puerto Vallarta and Cabo Corrientes municipalities in the Pacific coastal lowlands of western Jalisco. It grows on the upper edges of gallery forests along streams and rivers, between 100 and 1000 meters elevation. The coastal lowlands are part of the Jalisco dry forests ecoregion.

The species has a very limited range, and its extent of occurrence (EOO) is estimated to be less than 100 km^{2}.

== Conservation ==
The species is threatened by habitat loss from deforestation and conversion of its habitat to agriculture, pasture, and urbanization. Its conservation status is assessed as Critically Endangered.

== Systematics ==
Magnolia vallartensis belongs to sect. Magnolia. Other closely related species live in western Mexico, and constitute the Magnolia pacifica group – Magnolia pacifica from the seaward-facing mountains of Nayarit and western Jalisco, and Magnolia pugana from inland canyons and cloud forests in northern Jalisco and southern Zacatecas. M. vallartensis and M. pugana are sometimes classed as subspecies of M. pacifica.
