= Sierra de Álamos =

Coordinates: 26°59′N 109°00′W

Sierra de Álamos is a range of mountains, in the Sierra Madre Occidental in the Álamos Municipality of Sonora.

Portions of the range lie in the Sierra de Álamos–Río Cuchujaqui Biosphere Reserve. The upper slopes are covered in pine–oak forest, and the lower slopes are covered by dry forest and thorn scrub.
