= Tehueco, Sinaloa =

Coordinates: 26°17′43″N 108°44′42″W

Tehueco, is a town in El Fuerte Municipality, in the State of Sinaloa. It was named for the fierce Tehueco, one of the Native American people, who resisted the Spaniard conquest of Sinaloa.

Tehueco is the seat of the Tehueco Sindicatura one of seven sindicaturas that El Fuerte Municipality is subdivided into. The town of Tehueco has 859 inhabitants. It lies at an elevation 60 meters above sea level.

The town is located along the Fuerte River, a little above its confluence with one of its major tributaries, the Rio Cuchujaqui.
