= Gloria Fonda =

American actress

- Born: Gertude Katherine Fonda; January 24, 1894; St. Paul, Minnesota, U.S.
- Died: January 20, 1978 (aged 83); Álamos, Sonora, Mexico
- Occupation: Film Actress
- Spouse: Victor Emmett Dalton (m. 1924; div. 1939)
- Children: 2

Gloria Fonda (born Gertrude Katherine Fonda; January 24, 1894 – January 20, 1978) was a U.S. actress of the silent film era.

== Early years ==
Born in St. Paul, Minnesota and raised in Seattle, Washington, Fonda was the daughter of Mary Etta Walsh and Willard Archibald Fonda, a successful glove manufacturer. While she was a student at the University of Washington, she won a beauty contest, and in 1917 she was one of two winners in the International Beauty Contest held in the United States.

== Brief Movie Career ==
Fonda won a most beautiful girl in Washington pageant sponsored by Universal Pictures. Her home was in Seattle, Washington. She came to Hollywood with sixty other beauties from American states.

Fonda made only seven films during a career which lasted from 1915 to 1916. Often she appeared in movies directed by William C. Dowlan. Among these are The Mayor's Decision (1915), The Devil and Idle Hands (1915), and Drugged Waters (1916).

She played the role of Gladys Saunders in the latter, her final film. Released by Red Feather Productions, the drama concerned a health resort and a spring of water which was pure. The water was drugged daily in order to deceive wealthy people who came to the spa to restore their health. The Mayor's Decision was a short drama of politics, slum life, and double intrigue. It was a Universal and Carl Laemmle production.

Dowlan directed Fonda in a Laemmle single reel picture entitled The Great Fear (1915). Dowlan co-starred along with Lula Warrenton.

In 1919-1921 Fonda performed on stage in the Orient.

== Personal life and death ==
On October 22, 1934, Fonda married automobile and radio financier Victor Emmett Dalton; they separated on November 8, 1935, and were divorced on March 24, 1939. The marriage produced two daughters.

Fonda died in Álamos, Sonora, Mexico in 1978.
