= Leopoldo Verdugo Quiroz =

Mexican businessman and politician

Leopoldo Verdugo Quirós

Senator of the Congress of the Union from Baja California
- In office 7 September 1954 – 31 August 1958 Serving with Esteban Cantú

Personal details
- Born: 1 March 1898 Álamos, Sonora, Mexico
- Party: PRI
- Spouse: Catalina Saldamando
- Occupation: Businessman

Leopoldo L. Verdugo Quirós (born 1 March 1898) was a Mexican businessman, customs official, and politician affiliated with the Institutional Revolutionary Party (PRI). In 1954, he was elected one of Baja California's inaugural Senators alongside Esteban Cantú, serving in the XLII and XLIII Legislatures of the Congress of the Union.

== Early life ==
Verdugo Quiroz was born on 1 March 1898, in Álamos, Sonora. His parents, Leopoldo Verdugo Perrón and Natalia Quirós Quirós, married in 1895 and had 14 children. Verdugo Quiroz attended elementary school in Álamos, but dropped out of school and later fought in the Mexican Revolution. His father was a personal friend of Álvaro Obregón and worked as a government official – at one point he was responsible for nation's military purchases. In 1921, he moved the family to Mexicali and was appointed the tax administrator for the Territory of Baja California Norte by President Obregón.

In April 1922, Verdugo Quiroz was named the director of customs officers in Mexicali. He married Catalina Saldamando soon afterwards. Verdugo Quiroz subsequently worked in customs in the port cities of Veracruz and Matamoros before being named the Chief of the Mexicali Customs office in April 1932. He bought land in the Mexicali Valley and entered the agricultural sector. Verdugo Quiroz's businesses became successful and he joined a powerful group of landowners in the valley. He was able to amass economic and political influence in the region.

== Political career ==
During Juan Andreu Almazán's 1940 presidential campaign, Verdugo Quiroz served as his local campaign manager for the Territory of Baja California Norte. He was helping Andreu Almazán of the Revolutionary Party of National Unification (PRUN) challenge Manuel Ávila Camacho of the ruling Party of the Mexican Revolution (PRM). On the night of the election, Verdugo Quiroz was arrested in Mexicali, along with two other pro-Almazán leaders, for a shooting at the local PRM headquarters which resulted in Eduardo Garza Senande, the local campaign manager for Ávila Camacho, being struck in an artificial leg. The three were taken into custody but quickly released.

In 1952, Verdugo Quiroz helped establish the Acción Cívica Baja Californiana (Baja Californian Civic Action), a self-called regional political party made up of prominent farmers, businessmen, merchants, and professionals. After Baja California was granted statehood that same year, Verdugo Quiroz emerged as a pre-candidate for the Institutional Revolutionary Party (PRI) nomination for Governor of Baja California in the 1953 state elections, enjoying significant support from the agricultural sector in Mexicali Valley. He was not chosen by the party to move forward. However, the Acción Cívica Baja Californiana was absorbed by the PRI, with most of Verdugo Quiroz's supporters following him to his new party.

In December 1953, Verdugo Quiroz was cited in a newspaper column by journalist Alberto Rosales as one of five local political figures who might seek a nomination to represent the state in the Senate of the Republic. The PRI eventually selected Verdugo Quiroz and Esteban Cantú as its candidates. In the special election held on 4 July 1954, Verdugo Quiroz and Cantú were elected as the state's first two Senators. The pair were sworn in as members of the XLII Legislature on 7 September after the election results were certified. They both served in the Senate through the end of the XLIII Legislature in 1958. Verdugo Quiroz served as president of the Public Health Committee, first secretary of the Social Security Committee and the Agricultural and Development Committee, and second secretary of the Administration Committee.

In December 1958, Verdugo Quiroz announced his pre-candidacy for the following year's gubernatorial race. He held his first rally the next month, speaking to over 500 farmers in the Mexicali Valley to officially launch his campaign. However, Verdugo Quiroz was not selected by the party.
