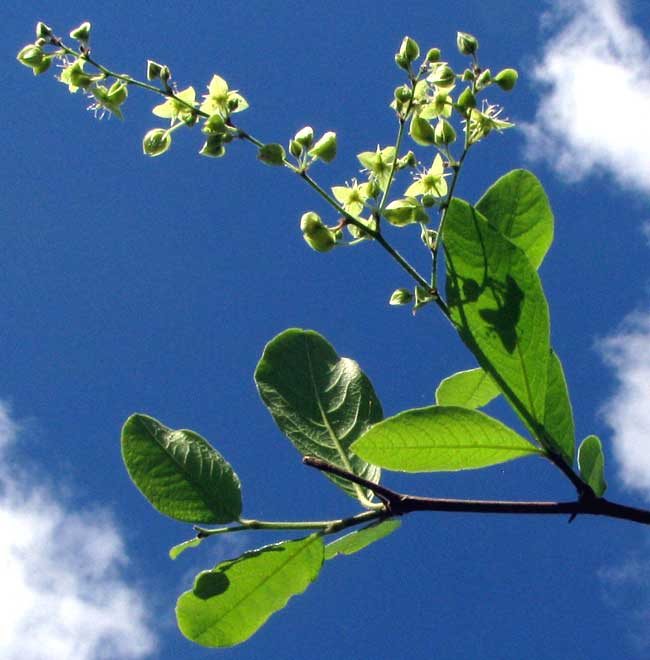
- Gymnopodium floribundum

Scientific classification
- Kingdom: Plantae
- Clade: Tracheophytes
- Clade: Angiosperms
- Clade: Eudicots
- Order: Caryophyllales
- Family: Polygonaceae
- Subfamily: Eriogonoideae
- Genus: Gymnopodium; Rolfe

Species
- Gymnopodium floribundum Rolfe; Gymnopodium toledense Ancona & Ortiz-Díaz

Synonyms
- Millspaughia B.L.Rob.

= Gymnopodium =

Genus of flowering plants

Gymnopodium is a genus of plants in the family Polygonaceae. It includes two species native to Belize, Guatemala, and southern Mexico.

- Gymnopodium floribundum Rolfe
- Gymnopodium toledense Ancona & Ortiz-Díaz
