= Manuel Sánchez (economist) =

Mexican economist

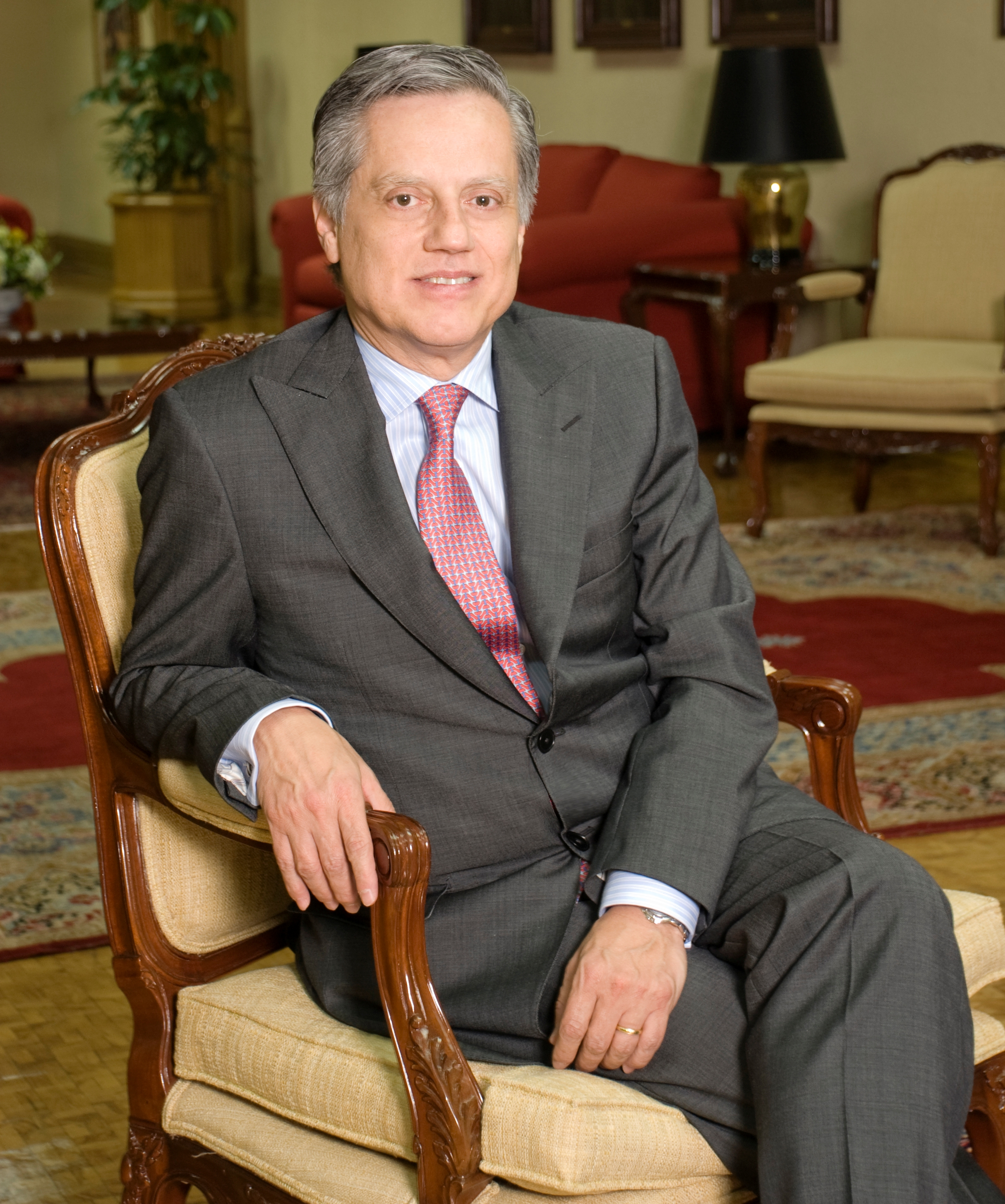

Deputy Governor of The Bank of Mexico
- In office May 27, 2009 – December 31, 2016
- Nominated by: President Felipe Calderón

Personal details
- Born: July 27, 1950 (age 76) Monterrey, Nuevo León, Mexico
- Spouse: Rosina C. Flores
- Children: Manuel; Eduardo; Pablo
- Education: ITESM-Campus Monterrey (B.A.’76); University of Missouri (MSc’79); The University of Chicago (AM’83 & PhD’85)

Manuel Sánchez (Monterrey, Nuevo León, July 27, 1950) is a Mexican economist with a wide-ranging professional career that includes positions in academics, banking, and central banking. He was nominated by President Felipe Calderón Hinojosa on April 23, 2009, as Deputy Governor and member of the Board of Governors at Banco de México, Mexico's central bank, for a term that ended on December 31, 2016. His appointment was ratified by the Standing Commission of the Mexican Congress on May 27, 2009.

== Personal ==
Manuel Sánchez is the son of Manuel Sánchez (1906–1996) and Josefina González (1916–2013) and is married to Rosina C. Flores, with whom he has three sons: Manuel (1989), Eduardo (1991), and Pablo (1995).

== Education ==
Manuel Sánchez holds a master's degree and Ph.D. in economics from The University of Chicago (1983, 1985), where his doctoral thesis adviser was Robert E. Lucas Jr., and his thesis committee was composed of Robert E. Lucas Jr., Arnold Zellner, and Lars Peter Hansen. While at Chicago, he also studied with Gary S. Becker, Robert W. Fogel, James J. Heckman, Arnold C. Harberger, Sherwin Rosen, Sanford J. Grossman, Jacob A. Frenkel, and Michael L. Mussa. In addition, he was a research assistant for Arnold Zellner and teaching assistant for James J. Heckman.

He holds a master's of science from the University of Missouri (1979) and received a bachelor's degree in economics with honors from the Monterrey Institute of Technology and Higher Education (ITESM), Monterrey campus (1976).

Throughout his career, he has received numerous academic honors, among them the Earhart Foundation Scholarship (1983–1984), the Milton Friedman Fund and Special UU Scholarship (1983–1984), a scholarship from Mexico's National Council of Science and Technology (Conacyt)(1979–1983), and a scholarship from the University of Missouri (1977–1979).

He was a PEW Teaching Fellow at The University of Chicago (1982–1983) and received the American Agricultural Economics Association Award for Professional Excellence (1980). He is also a member of the Honor Society of Agriculture Gamma Sigma Delta (1979).

== Career ==
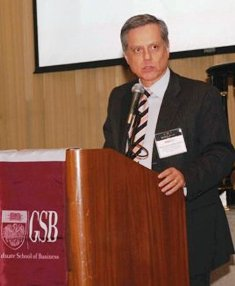
Manuel Sánchez, February 2008.

Between 2006 and 2009, Manuel Sánchez was Director of Investment at Valanza Grupo BBVA, the private equity unit of BBVA. He joined Grupo Financiero Bancomer, today Grupo Financiero BBVA Bancomer, in 1993 as Director of Financial Analysis and Investor Relations. From 1994 to 1998, he was Director of Planning and Finance for the Group's Retail Banking division. From 1998 to 2004, he was the Group's Corporate Director of Economic Studies, and between 2004 and 2006, he held the post of Director of Business Projects.

Previously, from 1989 to 1993, he headed the Center for Analysis and Economic Research at Mexico's Autonomous Institute of Technology (ITAM). From 1986 to 1989, he held the post of Manager of Economic Studies for Grupo Grupo Vitro. Between 1985 and 1986, he worked as an assistant professor in the department of economics at Boston College, and between 1984 and 1985, he was a full-time member of department of economics at the Autonomous University of Nuevo León (Universidad Autónoma de Nuevo León). In 1977, Manuel Sánchez was an economist at the industrial conglomerate Grupo Alfa and a professor of economics at the University of Monterrey (Universidad de Monterrey).

He has also taught part-time at the ITAM, the Monterrey campus of the ITESM, and the Autonomous University of Nuevo León.

== Other professional activities ==
Manuel Sánchez has participated in the administration of many institutions. Between 2011 and 2014, he was a member of the board of directors of the Banco Latinoamericano de Comercio Exterior, S. A. (Bladex). From 1992 to 1994, he was a member of the Board of Directors of Grupo EUREKA, and from 1992 to 1993, a member of the Board of Directors of the Foundation for the Support of the Community.

Since 2011, he has been a member of the Global Advisory Board to the Booth School of Business at The University of Chicago, as well as of the National Advisory Board for Financial Inclusion. Between 2006 and 2010, he was president and founder of the organization Friends of The University of Chicago (Amigos de la Universidad de Chicago, A. C.), and from 2002 to 2006, member of the Mexican Commission on Macroeconomics and Health. From 1999 to 2000, he was president of the Mexican Institute of Finance Executives' (IMEF) National Committee of Economic Studies and Director of the IMEF National Board. Since 1989, he has been a member of the Technical Advisory Board of the Private Sector Center for Economic Studies (CEESP).

Between 2007 and 2009, he was on the Editorial Board of the IMEF's magazine Ejecutivos de Finanzas and from 2001 to 2009, a member of the Editorial Board of the Mexican newspaper Reforma.

Since 2002 he has been a member of The Mont Pelerin Society, since 2001, of the Alamos Alliance, and since 1998, of the IMEF's National Committee of Economic Studies.

Since 1998, he has written the column "Razones y Proporciones" for the newspaper Reforma, which focuses on current economic, monetary, and financial issues.

== Books ==
Sánchez, M. (2006). Economía Mexicana para Desencantados, Mexico: Fondo de Cultura Económica.

Sánchez, M. y R. Corona (eds.), (1993). Privatization in Latin America, Washington: Banco Interamericano de Desarrollo.

Sánchez, M. (ed.), (1993). Procesos de Privatización en América Latina, Washington: ITAM-BID.

== Articles ==
Sánchez, M. (2016). "The Powers and Limits of Monetary Policy," The Cato Journal, Vol. 36, No. 2.

Sánchez, M. (2016). "La Necesidad de no Repetir la Historia," El Trimestre Económico, Vol. LXXXIII (2), No. 330, April–June.

Sánchez, M. (2016). "Political Shifts in Latin America," presented at the Emerging Markets Summit, The University of Chicago Booth School of Business, Chicago, April.

Sánchez, M. (2016). "Memoria de la economía mexicana," Nexos, February 1.

Sánchez, M. (2015). “Monetary Policy Normalisation in the US, the Limits of Macro-prudential Tools and Developing Capital Markets,” Central Banking, 25(4), May.

Sánchez, M. (2015). “El Trimestre, un Proyecto en Transformación,” El Trimestre Económico, Vol. LXXXII (3), No. 327, July–September.

Sánchez, M. (2014). “El Enigmático Sistema Bancario Mexicano Contemporáneo,” El Trimestre Económico, Vol. LXXXI (1), No. 321, January–March.

Sánchez, M. (2013). “Global Financial Stability and Central Bank Cooperation: What Have We Learned? – Presentation,” in Central Bank Cooperation at the Beginning of the 21st Century, Mexico: CEMLA.

Sánchez, M. (2013). "Repaso al Sistema Bancario," Nexos, November 1.

Sánchez, M. (2011). "Financial Crises: Prevention, Correction, and Monetary Policy," The Cato Journal, Vol. 31, No. 3.

Sánchez, M. (2010). "Estabilidad Financiera, Crecimiento Económico y Política Monetaria," E-fecto; also published in Contrapunto, Revista Estudiantil del CIDE, year 5, March 2011.

Sánchez, M. (2010). "Financial Innovation and the Global Crisis," International Journal of Business and Management, 5(11).

Sánchez, M. (2010). "La innovación Financiera y la Crisis Mundial," El Trimestre Económico, Vol. LXXVII (3), No. 307, July–September.

Sánchez, M. et al., (2010). “The Financial Crisis – Where Are We Now, and What Are the Prospects for Unwinding Public Interventions in the Financial Sector?” in Das, U.S. and M.G. Papaioannou (eds.), Unwinding Financial Sector Interventions, Preconditions and Practical Considerations, Washington: International Monetary Fund.

Sánchez, M. (2008). “El Financiamiento del Estado, la Reforma Fiscal y el Crecimiento Económico,” Gaceta de Economía, Instituto Tecnológico Autónomo de México, 14(24).

Sánchez, M. (2005). "The Recent Stabilization Experience in Mexico," The Cato Journal, Vol. 25, No. 1.

Sánchez, M. (2004). "Estadística de Valores y Creencias Mundiales," Letras Libres, November.

Sánchez, M. (2002). “The Need for Monetary Reform in Mexico,” The Cato Journal, Vol. 22, No. 2; also published in The ICFAI Journal of Monetary Economics, Vol. II, No. 2.

Sánchez, M. and N. Karp (2002). “Inflación Política Monetaria y Unión Monetaria en México,” in Sebastián, M. (ed.), (2002). Ensayos sobre Colombia y América Latina, Madrid: BBVA.

Sánchez, M. (2001). “Two Cheers for Mexico's Tax Reform,” The Wall Street Journal, March 30.
