= Meseta de Cacaxtla Flora and Fauna Protection Area =

Protected area in Sinaloa, Mexico

- IUCN category VI (protected area with sustainable use of natural resources)
- Location within Mexico
- Location: Sinaloa, Mexico
- Nearest city: Mazatlán
- Coordinates: 23°35′58.5″N 106°39′16.4″W
- Area: 50,862 ha (196.38 sq mi)
- Designated: 2000
- Administrator: National Commission of Natural Protected Areas

Meseta de Cacaxtla Flora and Fauna Protection Area is a protected area in the state of Sinaloa in western Mexico. It covers an area of 508.62 km^{2}.

== Geography ==
It is bounded on the west by the Pacific Ocean, and on the east by Mexican Federal Highway 15. Mexican Federal Highway 15D runs through the protected area, parallel to the shore.

== Ecology ==
The protected area is in the Sinaloan dry forests ecoregion, and includes areas of deciduous thorn scrub, mangrove, coastal lagoon, and beach.

== Flora and Fauna ==
According to the National Biodiversity Information System of Comisión Nacional para el Conocimiento y Uso de la Biodiversidad (CONABIO) in Meseta de Cacaxtla Flora and Fauna Protection Area there are over 1,215 plant and animal species from which 81 are in at risk category and 62 are exotics.

== Conservation ==
The reserve was designated in 2000.
