= Sonoran–Sinaloan transition subtropical dry forest =

Ecoregion in Sonora and Sinaloa, Mexico

Sonoran-Sinaloan transition subtropical dry forest
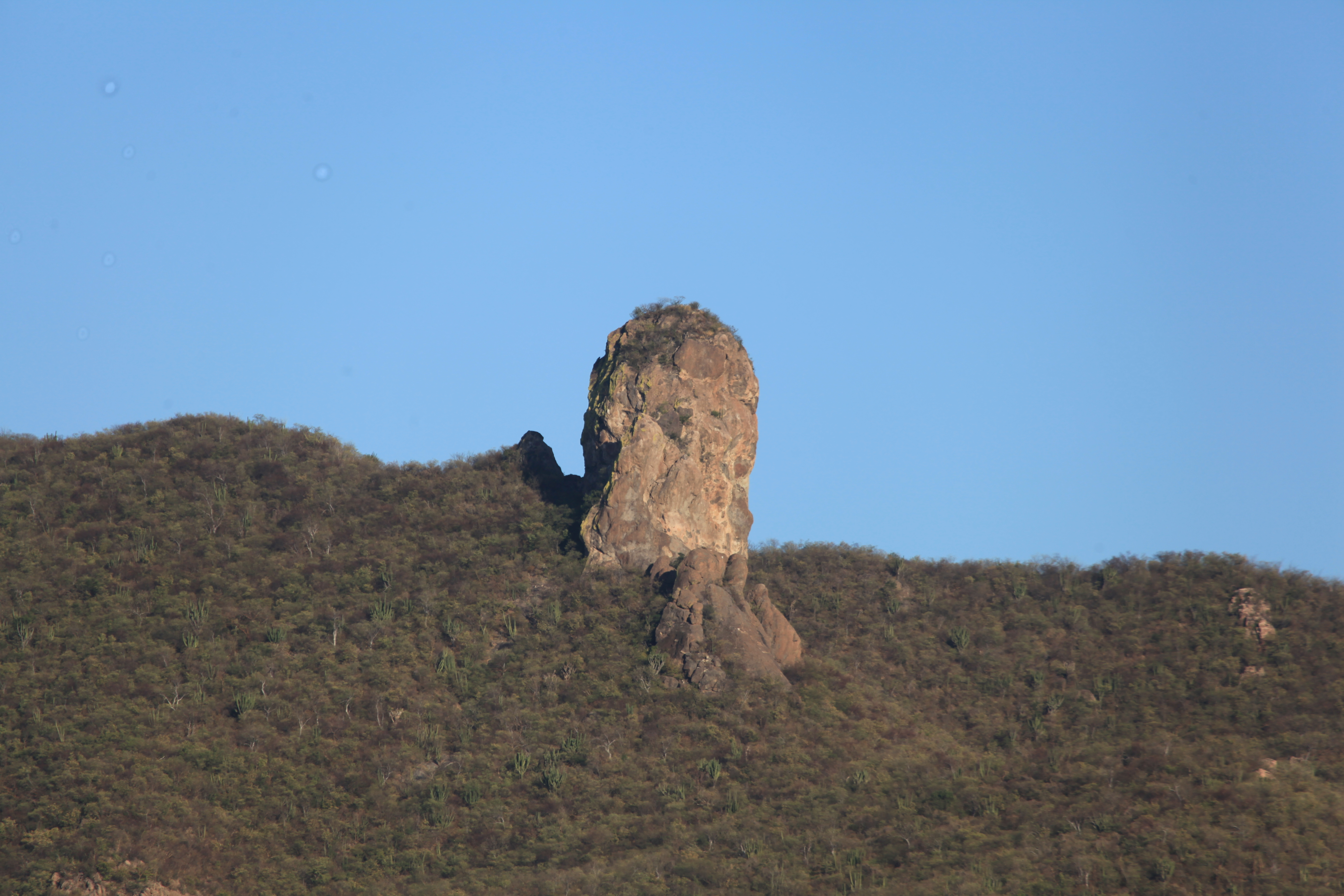
- Dry forest near San Blas, Sinaloa

Ecology
- Realm: Nearctic
- Biome: Tropical and subtropical dry broadleaf forests
- Borders: List: Sonoran Desert; Sierra Madre Occidental pine–oak forests; Chihuahuan desert; Sinaloan dry forests; Northern Mesoamerican Pacific mangroves
- Bird species: 215
- Mammal species: 95

Geography
- Area: 50,326 km^{2} (19,431 mi^{2})
- Country: Mexico
- States: Sonora; Sinaloa
- Climate type: Hot semi-arid (BSh)

Conservation
- Conservation status: Critical/endangered
- Global 200: Mexican dry forests
- Habitat loss: 21.36%
- Protected: 2,029 km² (4%)

The Sonoran–Sinaloan transition subtropical dry forest is a tropical dry broadleaf forest ecoregion in northwestern Mexico.

== Geography ==
This ecoregion forms a transition belt between the Sonoran Desert to the north and the Sinaloan dry forests to the south, running south from the foothills of the Sierra Madre Occidental highlands of the state of Sonora to the Pacific Ocean coasts of Sonora and Sinaloa. This region is also part of the transition zone between the Nearctic and Neotropical realms and as such habitats of the region range from sparse semi-desert in the north to dry forest in the south. It covers an area of 51,000 km^{2} (20,000 sq mi) from sea level to 2,000 m (6,600 ft).

== Climate ==
The climate is subtropical and semi-arid. Annual rainfall is 100–200 mm (3.9–7.9 in), and comes mostly in the summer months.

== Flora ==
The characteristic vegetation is deciduous thorn forest and woodland ("selva espinosa"), with areas of thorn scrub. Characteristic trees include the boat-thorn acacia (Acacia cochliacantha), tree catclaw (Acacia occidentalis), torote prieto (Bursera fragilis), and palo santo (Ipomoea arborescens). Cacti are common, including organ pipe cactus (Stenocereus thurberi), jumping cholla (Cylindropuntia fulgida) and barrel cactus (Ferocactus wislizeni).

== Fauna ==
Large mammals include white-tailed deer (Odocoileus virginianus), javelina (Dicotyles tajacu), jaguar (Panthera onca), and coyote (Canis latrans).

As in the Sonoran Desert, nectar-feeding long-tongued bats like the Mexican long-tongued bat (Choeronycteris mexicana) and Pallas's long-tongued bat (Glossophaga soricina) are important pollinators. The ecoregion has over 90 species of butterflies.

Birds of the ecoregion include the black-throated magpie-jay (Calocitta colliei).

== Threats and preservation ==
This woodland is vulnerable to logging and clearance for livestock grazing, particularly around the cities of Navojoa, Álamos, and Sinaloa de Leyva. While the wildlife is vulnerable to hunting. Areas of particular conservation importance include the Yaqui River basin.

A 2017 assessment found that 2,029 km^{2}, or 4%, of the ecoregion is in protected areas. Roughly 13% of the unprotected area is relatively-intact habitat.

== See also ==
- List of ecoregions in Mexico
