= Magnolia panamensis =

Conservation status
- Least Concern (IUCN 3.1)

Scientific classification
- Kingdom: Plantae
- Clade: Embryophytes
- Clade: Tracheophytes
- Clade: Spermatophytes
- Clade: Angiosperms
- Clade: Magnoliids
- Order: Magnoliales
- Family: Magnoliaceae
- Genus: Magnolia
- Section: Magnolia sect. Magnolia
- Species: M. panamensis

Binomial name
- Magnolia panamensis A.Vázquez & H.H.Iltis

Species of flowering plant

Magnolia panamensis is a species of flowering plant in the family Magnoliaceae. It is native to Panama, and its distribution probably extends into Costa Rica. It is a forest tree with few current threats to its populations.

== Range and habitat ==
Magnolia panamensis is native to the Cordillera Central of western Panama, in the provinces Bocas del Toro and Chiriquí, and extending to the Costa Rican border. There is a population in La Amistad National Park. Its range is presumed to extend into the Cordillera de Talamanca of Costa Rica. The species' potential forest distribution is 2,107 km^{2}.

It is found in humid montane forests from 2,000 to 2,600 meters elevation.

The species' population is thought to be stable, and its conservation status is assessed as least concern.
