= Álamos =

Álamos, Sonora
- Town
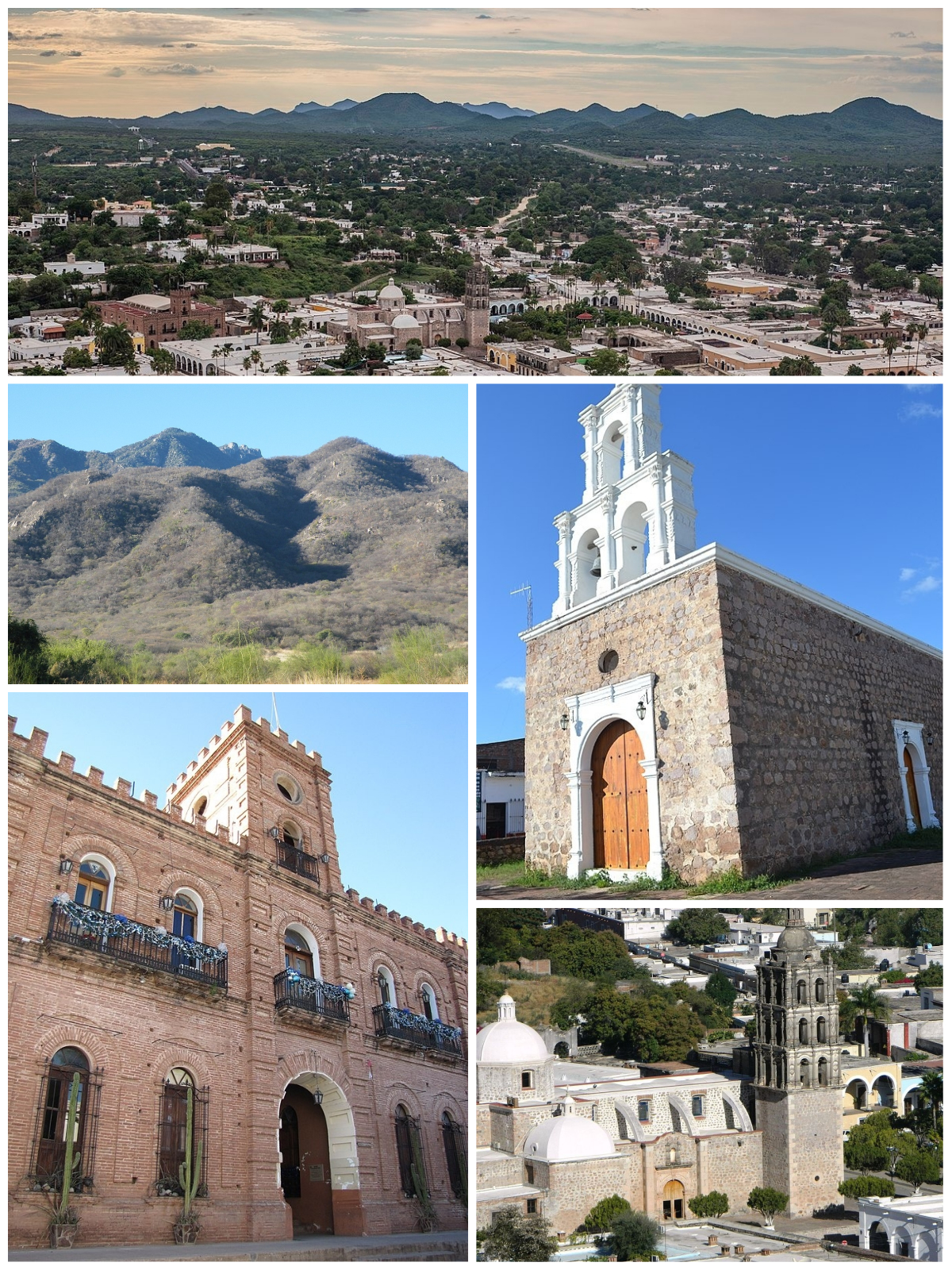
- Top, from left to right: Panoramic view of Álamos, Chapel of Zapopan, Semi-arid municipality landscape, City Hall, Cathedral of Purísima Concepción

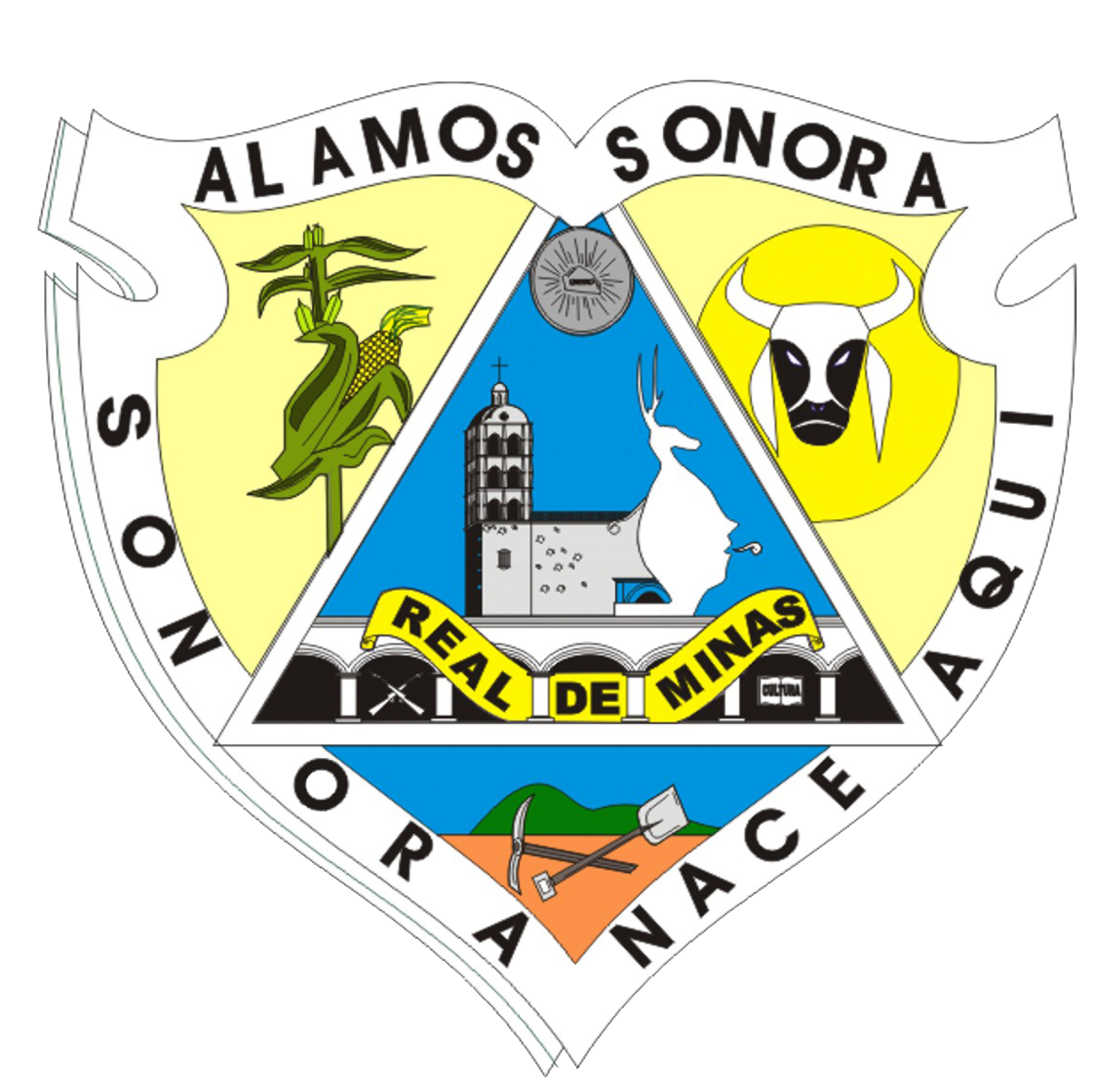
- Coat of arms

- Location in Mexico Álamos (Mexico)
- Coordinates: 27°1′39″N 108°56′24″W
- Country: Mexico
- State: Sonora
- Municipality: Álamos
- Founded: Late 17th century

Population (2020)
  - Total: 10,961
  - Density: 2,014.88/km^{2} (5,218.5/sq mi)
- Time zone: UTC-07:00 (Zona Pacífico)
- Postal code: 85760
- Area code: 647

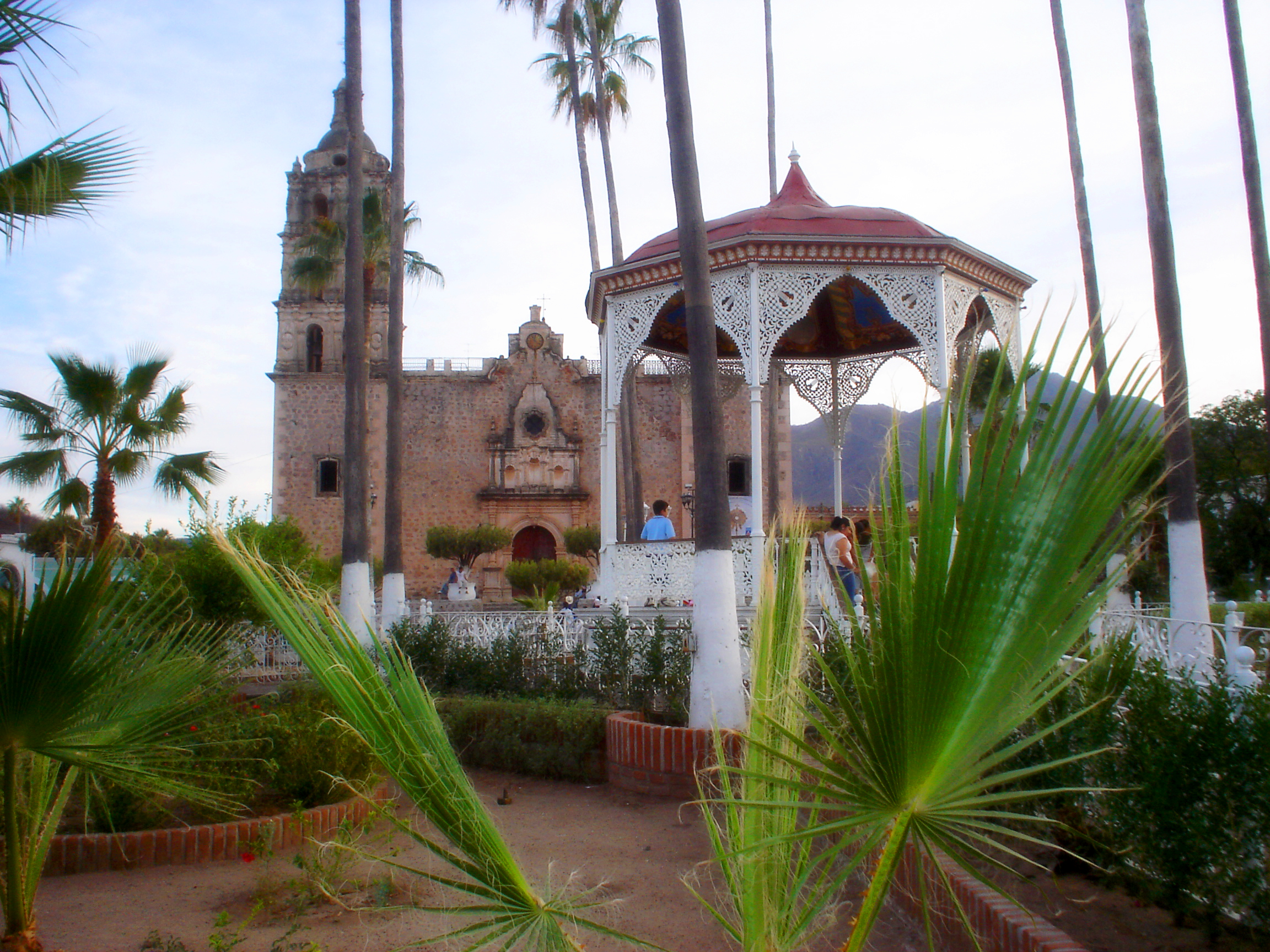
Plaza de Armas

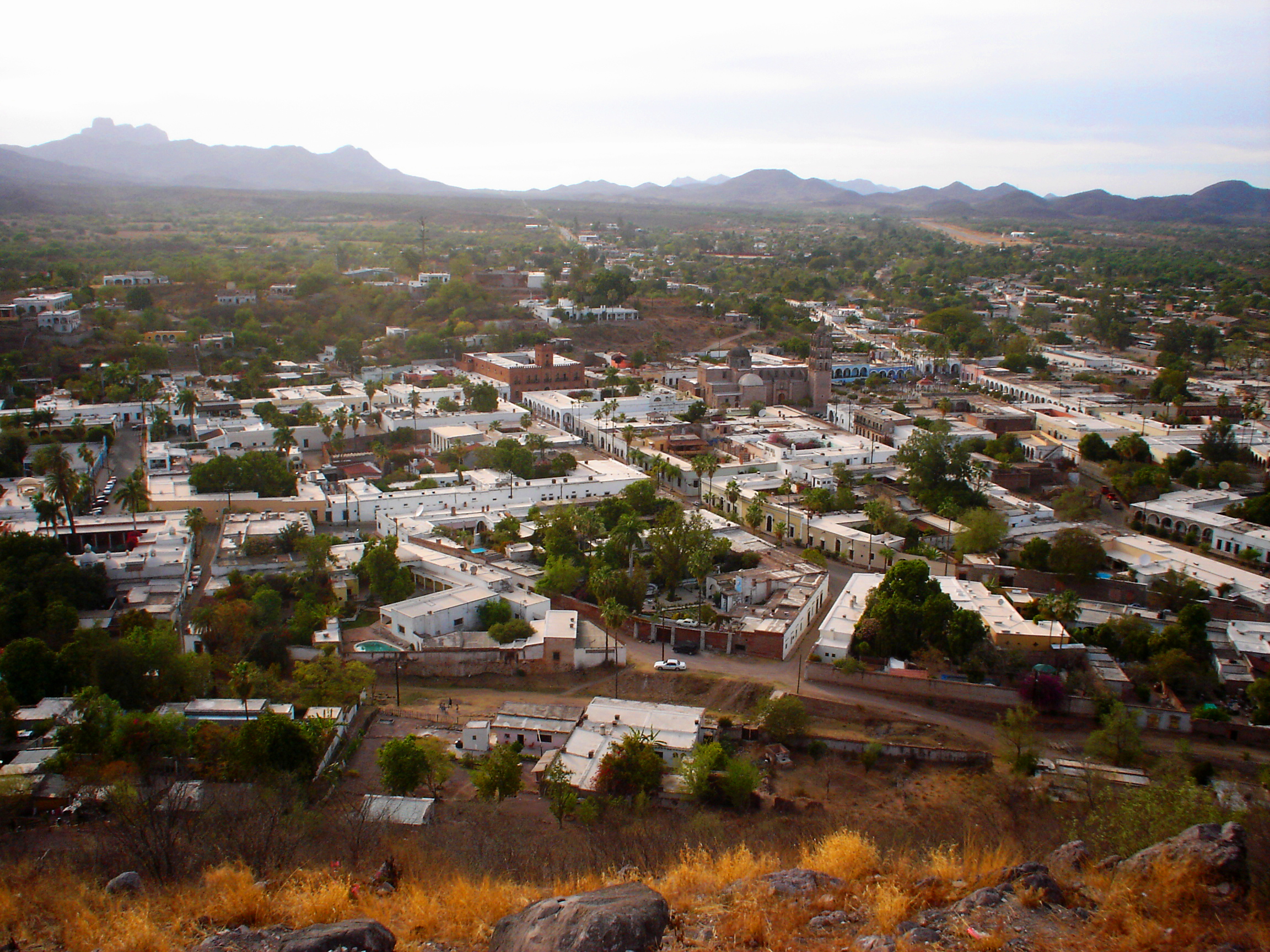
View of Álamos from mirador

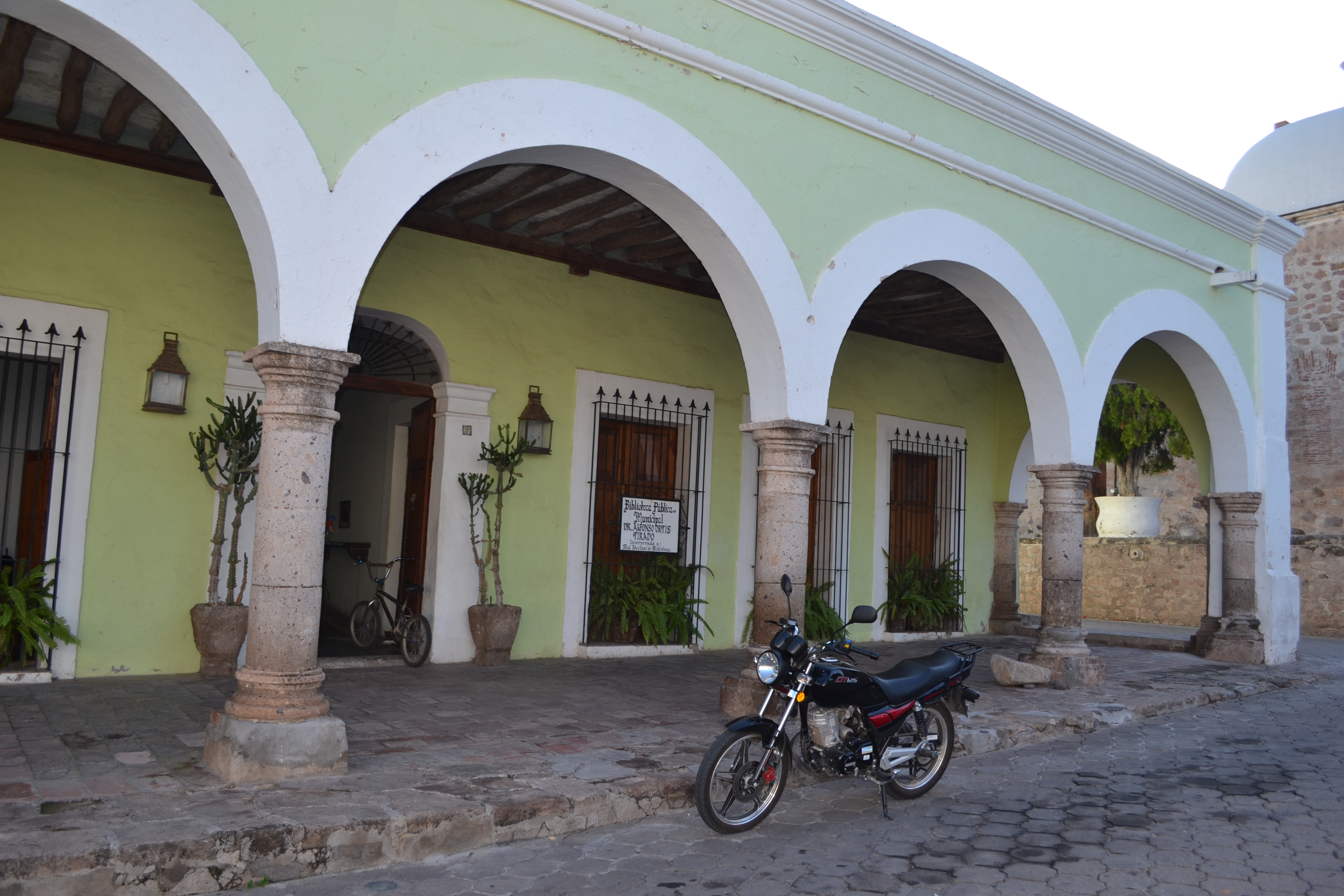
Municipal Library "Dr. Alfonso Ortiz Tirado"

Álamos (Spanish: ['alamos]) is a town in Álamos Municipality in the Mexican state of Sonora, in northwestern Mexico.

Historically an important center of silver mining, the town's economy is now dominated by the tourist sector. Designated a pueblo mágico due to its architecture, the town is host to several arts festivals, most notably the Festival Cultural "Alfonso Ortíz Tirado". It also hosts the Alamos Alliance, a yearly summit of economic policy makers, academics and business leaders founded and led by Arnold Harberger that has led to the town being called the "Little Mexican Davos".

== Name ==
The Municipality of Álamos derives its name from the álamo (poplar or cottonwood) tree. Several impressive specimens are found in one of its two principal plazas, the Alameda. The nearby hamlet, El Sabinito, located within the municipality, also derives its name from a tree, the sabino ("Montezuma cypress").

== History ==
The area was named by the conquistador Francisco Vásquez de Coronado. His expedition of 1540 camped at the confluence of the two major arroyos (Escondido and the Aduana) of present-day Álamos and made reference to local geographical landmarks, including two large rock formations on Mount Alamos known as Los Frailes, 'the monks' in English.

As historian David Leighton explained, "Its first known name was Real de los Frailes or "Mining Camp of the Friars," a designation taken from some tall white rocks that appeared like hooded monks near the village."

Under the name Los Frailes, Alamos was initially part of Sinaloa. In the 1670s, rumor of silver deposits at Los Frailes must already have circulated, because the position of Alcalde Mayor of Sinaloa was hotly contested in 1673. The Navarrese Isidro Atondo de Antillon won the position over Gabriel Fontes de Espinosa. Atondo had the backing of the Viceroy, while Fontes' promoter was the governor of New Vizcaya (now Chihuahua and Durango). In effect, Atondo's appointment cemented Alamos as independent of local potentates and reporting direct to the viceroy.

In 1678, Atondo was promoted to Governor of Sinaloa, and Admiral of the Gulf of California. As admiral he built three ships at Nio in Sinaloa, and lead the expedition that included Jesuit Eusebio Francisco Kino 1683-85 to find a path across the Baja California peninsula to the Pacific Ocean. Alamos is in the foothills of the Sierra Madre Occidental, and the port used by Admiral Atondo was Santa Lucia, known as Javaros in the 21st century.

The year 1683 is when the silver mines at Los Frailes (i.e., Alamos) were officially founded. Alamos is on the Mayo River, which flows through Navojoa into the Gulf of California. The Mayo people live along this river.

Networks of upstart Spaniards from Navarre were growing in the 1673-1683 period, and Atondo was part of this, along with the incoming 1678 governor of New Vizcaya Francisco Agramont. Another famous Navarrese was Domingo Petris Gironza de Cruzat, who was 1683-86 governor of New Mexico, and in 1693-97 Alcalde Mayor of Sonora (Sonora's highest office at the time).

Alamos sits at a major crossroads on the border of Sinaloa and Sonora, with a road all the way to Tucson, Arizona where Gironza de Cruzat's ally Jesuit Eusebio Kino baptized in the 1680s and 1690s. Alamos is opposite Baja California which was a bridge to trade with Asia given the galleon's route along its outer edge. The twin events of 1683 were: Los Frailes emerged as a mining center in 1683, while its Alcalde Mayor Atondo in the same year of 1683 set out to find a packtrain path across the Baja California peninsula to an anchorage that held sufficient water to replenish the galleon which carried hundreds of people. Alamos was then a center of a mining region that held significant independence from Madrid and even Mexico City, but was tightly connected to Chihuahua, Sinaloa, Arizona, and Baja California. The beautiful haciendas that stand today once were home to the major financiers of silver in this wide region.

The next leader of Alamos was Domingo Teran de los Rios, and it is to him that the founding on December 8, 1685 is typically credited. Teran was a Spanish soldier, Domingo Terán de los Ríos, and by 1785, the silver mines at Promontorios, La Aduana, Las Cabras, La Quintera had been discovered. Rios in 1686 became governor of Sonora and Sinaloa, where he was successful in quelling Indian disturbances.

Another strongman at Alamos was Andres de Rezabal who in the 1720s had like Atondo ships in the Gulf of California. Rezabal sent the ships to persuade the Pericu of the islands of southern Baja California to dive for pearls, near the Bahia de Cerralvo, where he knew the Jesuits.

Eighty years later in 1768, historian Ignacio del Rio found that Jose de Galvez, the King's man in New Spain, convened a meeting of the major silver merchants of Alamos in the town's center. Galvez promised to cut the price of state-financed mercury in half if they would support consolidating the Spanish state's control over Sonora. The first half of his plan was to put down resistance of the Seri people to mines along Sonora's coast north of the Yaqui river, and the merchants of Alamos supported that. The second part of the King's plan was for the merchants of Alamos to buy shares in a silver company sponsored by the King, on which they would pay taxes at a new Caja de Alamos which Galvez prudently situated in the home of a certain Juan Agustin de Iriarte who was leader among Alamos' merchants. These independent families did not purchase shares in the King's silver company, nor are there records of significant taxes collected from Alamos in this era.

Noted above was the road between Alamos and Tucson. A major expedition led by Juan Bautista de Anza II, Captain of Tubac, departed Álamos in 1775 to discover a route to Alta California. In fact, Anza had an aunt in Culiacan married to a one-time Alcalde Mayor de Sonora. He collected settlers in Culiacan, then Alamos, and finally in Tubac (near his own ranches), before heading west to Yuma and on to the Pacific Coast at Mission San Gabriel (now Los Angeles). The Anza expedition had nearly 300 members, of which about half were from Álamos. The trek was financed by the wealthy silver mine owners of Álamos, and it established the Presidio of Monterey. Indeed, the son of merchants of Alamos, Felipe de Goycoechea, would later command the presidio on the Santa Barbara Channel until 1803.

Álamos became the capital of what was then the state of Occidental in the early 1800s. Occidental encompassed today's state of Sonora, the northern portion of the state of Sinaloa, and some of Baja California and southern Arizona. Álamos was the northernmost "Silver City" in Mexico. While it has much in common, architecturally, with Mexico's other "Silver Cities," Álamos has not succumbed to large-scale commercialism and has managed to retain the charm and pace of earlier times.

Álamos is known as "La Ciudad de los Portales" (portales are tall, arched, covered verandas or walkways fronting many of the cobble-stoned streets or calles). Álamos boasts numerous buildings exhibiting classic Andalusian architecture from Mexico's Colonial period, including numerous mansions, the Plaza de Armas, the Church of La Purísima Concepción, La Capilla and the Palacio Municipal ("city hall").

The great wealth created by the silver mines from the surrounding mining towns of La Aduana, Minas Nuevas, and others enabled the founders and residents of Álamos to build scores of colonial Spanish mansions throughout the town; most of them went into ruin in the early 20th century but in the late 1940s, a number of Americans and Canadians began buying and restoring the houses.

Most notably, William Levant Alcorn, an American farmer, bought one of the decaying mansions there, restored it and opened a hotel. The publicity he brought to Alamos breathed new life into this once prosperous city, which in turn attracted further investment in the years ahead.

By 1955, the city had electricity running from dusk to about midnight and in 1960 electrical power began to run 24 hours a day, being generated at a dam on a nearby river.

In the 1980s, a study was done by the students at the University of Sinaloa, which resulted in 185 structures in town being listed as historic monuments.

The Alamos Alliance was started in 1993 by Arnold Harberger as a small gathering among friends to discuss economic policy.

== Geography ==
Álamos is located in the southeastern part of Sonora, and 396 km (246 mi) from state capital Hermosillo, 54 km (34 mi) from Navojoa via Sonora State Highway 162, and 663 km (412 mi) from the northern border town of Nogales. The State of Chihuahua is on the east, and the State of Sinaloa on the south. The population of the municipality is 24,493 and its area is 6,947.27 square kilometres or 2,682 square miles.

=== Climate ===
Álamos has a semi-arid climate (Köppen BSh) bordering on a tropical savanna climate, with three seasons: a hot, dry season from April to June, a hot, humid wet season from July to October, and a warm, generally dry "winter" from November to March. Occasionally the dry winter pattern is interrupted by the passage of frontal cloudbands: 220 millimetres (8.66 in) fell during January 1981, including 168 millimetres (6.61 in) between the fifth and the seventh of that month, and over 120 millimetres (4.72 in) in January 1979. During the hot early summer, temperatures can reach extreme heights; the record being 49.5 °C (121.1 °F) on 16 June 1976.

Climate data for Álamos (1951-2010)
Month	Jan	Feb	Mar	Apr	May	Jun	Jul	Aug	Sep	Oct	Nov	Dec	Year
Record high °C (°F)	41.5 (106.7)	44.0 (111.2)	44.0 (111.2)	43.0 (109.4)	48.0 (118.4)	49.5 (121.1)	45.5 (113.9)	44.0 (111.2)	46.0 (114.8)	43.0 (109.4)	39.0 (102.2)	39.0 (102.2)	49.5 (121.1)
Mean daily maximum °C (°F)	27.8 (82.0)	28.8 (83.8)	30.2 (86.4)	32.5 (90.5)	35.2 (95.4)	38.0 (100.4)	36.2 (97.2)	35.1 (95.2)	35.2 (95.4)	34.4 (93.9)	31.7 (89.1)	28.6 (83.5)	32.8 (91.0)
Mean daily minimum °C (°F)	9.2 (48.6)	9.5 (49.1)	10.2 (50.4)	11.6 (52.9)	14.1 (57.4)	18.2 (64.8)	19.8 (67.6)	20.1 (68.2)	18.4 (65.1)	15.2 (59.4)	11.5 (52.7)	9.5 (49.1)	13.9 (57.0)
Record low °C (°F)	0.0 (32.0)	−4 (25)	2.0 (35.6)	5.0 (41.0)	6.5 (43.7)	8.0 (46.4)	9.0 (48.2)	9.5 (49.1)	1.3 (34.3)	6.5 (43.7)	0.4 (32.7)	0.0 (32.0)	−4 (25)
Average rainfall mm (inches)	35.0 (1.38)	17.9 (0.70)	17.8 (0.70)	1.9 (0.07)	3.9 (0.15)	25.5 (1.00)	184.4 (7.26)	198.2 (7.80)	86.3 (3.40)	53.1 (2.09)	26.3 (1.04)	37.0 (1.46)	687.3 (27.05)
Average rainy days (≥ 0.1 mm)	2.4	1.4	1.2	0.3	0.4	2.2	12.8	11.0	6.8	3.1	1.6	2.2	45.4
Source: Servicio Meteorólogico Nacional

== Economy ==
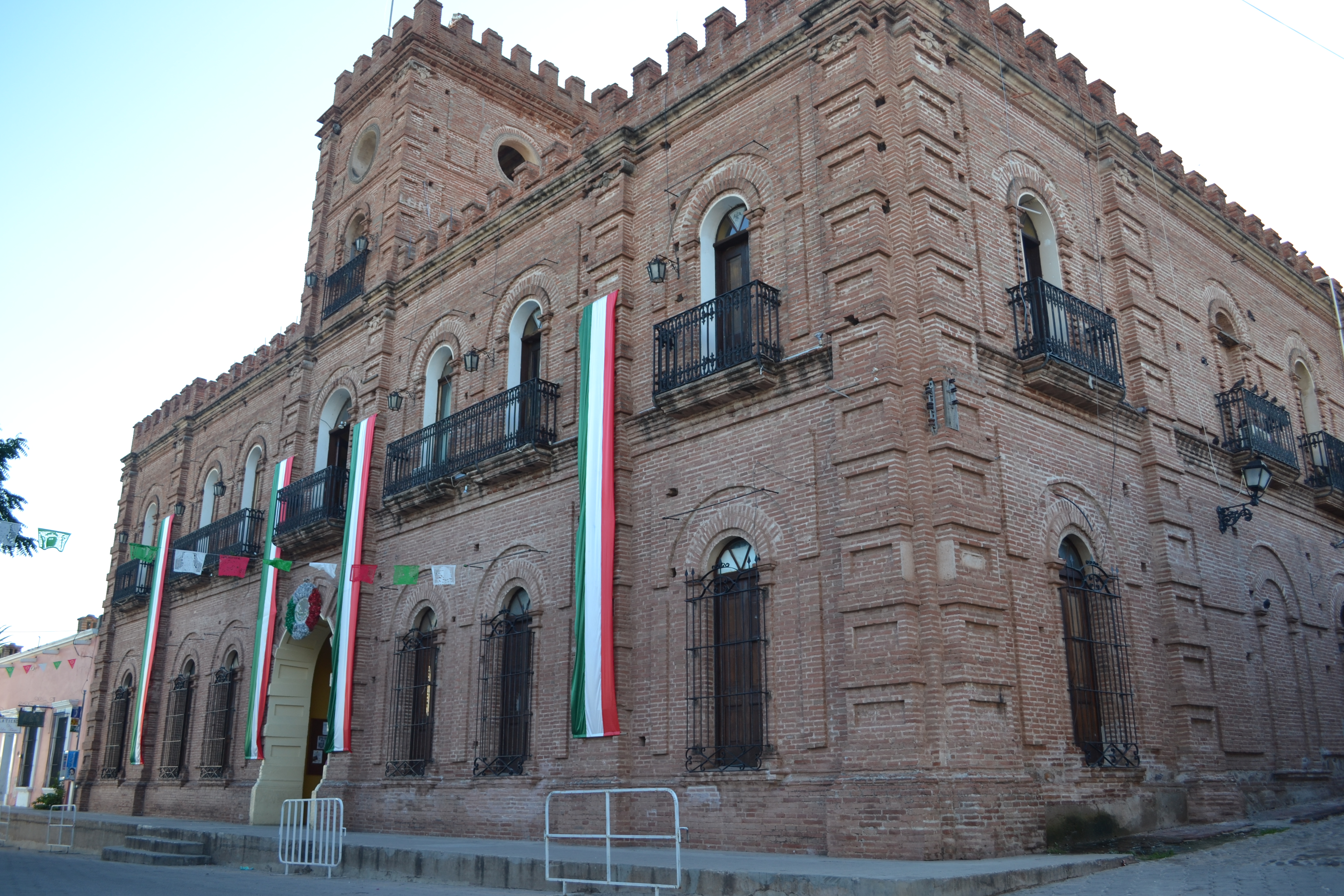
City Hall

After a heyday lasting from the late 1600s until the early 1900s, when the silver mines closed, the economy of Alamos went into a serious decline. Only a few hundred people remained in the once vibrant city due to a major decline in silver prices, ongoing unrest in the country with a revolution in progress, and the exodus of business owners and people of wealth. Vacant mansions went into disrepair until foreigners began restoring homes in 1946 after three decades of abandonment, bringing employment to locals with building and housekeeping skills. The area's top industries for decades were ranching and tourism. The present-day economy includes copper and silver mines. About 16 km to the northwest is the Adolfo Ruiz Cortinez Dam and Reservoir known as "El Mocúzarit", whose waters irrigate 80,000 acres (320 km^{2}). Cattle ranching is seasonal and declining due to impoverished grazing lands. Numerous chicken and pig farms, called "granjas," contribute substantially to the economy.

=== Tourism ===
Álamos was named a "Pueblo Mágico" in 2005. "Pueblo Magico" is a designation given by the Mexican Secretariat of Tourism to towns that offer a 'magical' experience by reason of their natural beauty, cultural riches and historical relevance.

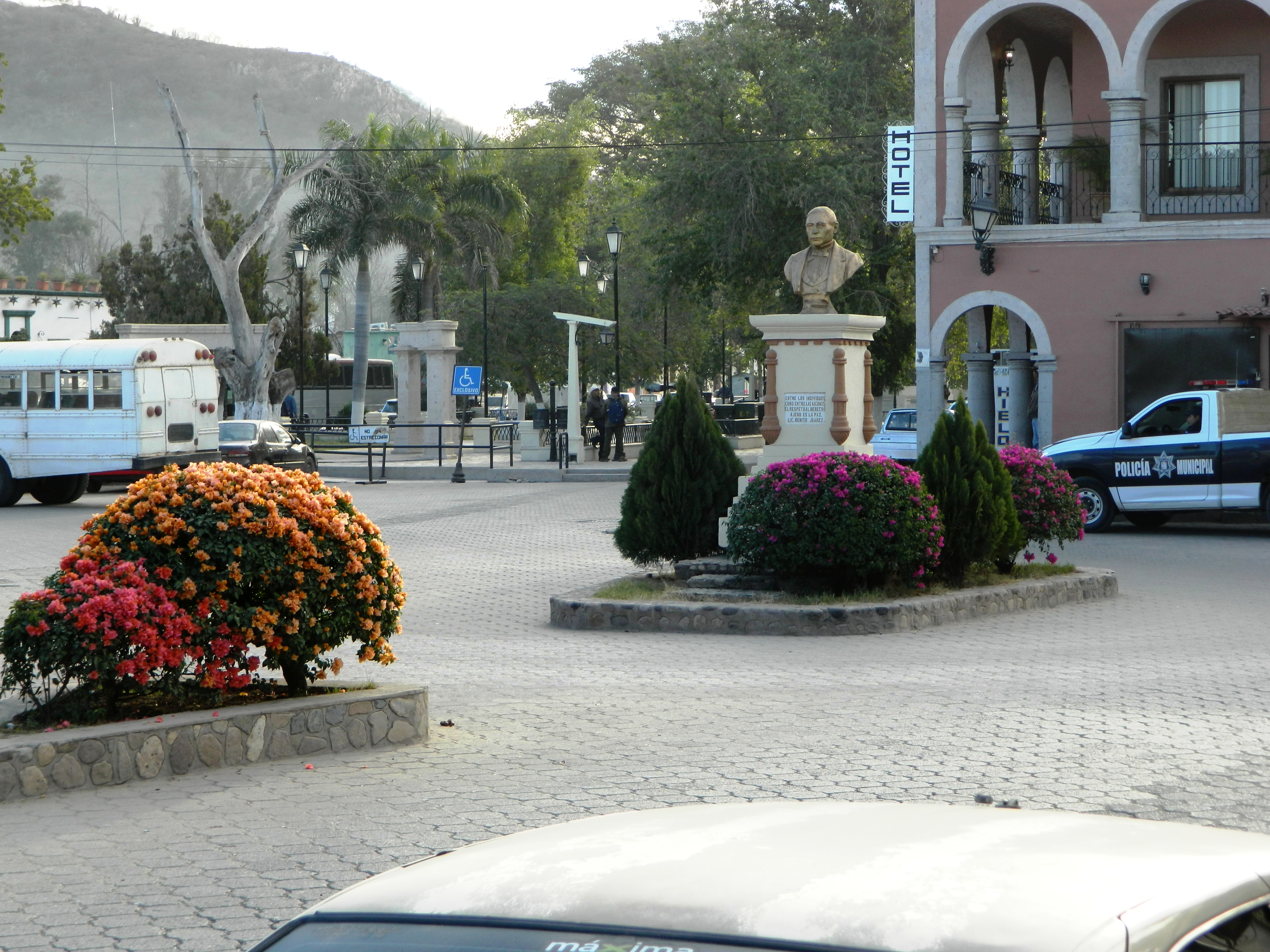
Alameda

Álamos has many festivals and fiestas year-round. Most notable is the annual Festival of Dr. Alfonso Ortiz Tirado ("FAOT"), a nine-day event in late January that is attended by many national and international musicians and celebrities. Dr. Alfonso Ortiz Tirado, born in this community in 1894, achieved recognition for being "El Tenor de las Américas." An impressive exhibit of Ortiz Tirado is found in the Museo Costumbrista, located in front of and to the east of the Plaza de Armas. The annual film festival is usually held in March. Several professional hunting lodges operate in the Alamos area, attracting dove hunters from various areas of the world. Álamos has more recently been the location for film production, including a European Endemol production and more than 180 episodes of the 'novela' (soap opera) La Fuerza del Destino.

The Sierra de Álamos–Río Cuchujaqui Biosphere Reserve offers serious "birding" opportunities. The creek of Cuchujaqui, which is in the ecological reserve is the most species-rich subtropical area in the Northern Hemisphere. Cuchujaqui is the subject of international scientific study and the southern migration destination of hundreds of different species of birds.

The presence of a jet-rated airport in Alamos (XALA) attracts aviators from Mexico, the U.S. and Canada. There is also charter service available to some areas of the Copper Canyon. The village has more than 20 hotels and B&B's.

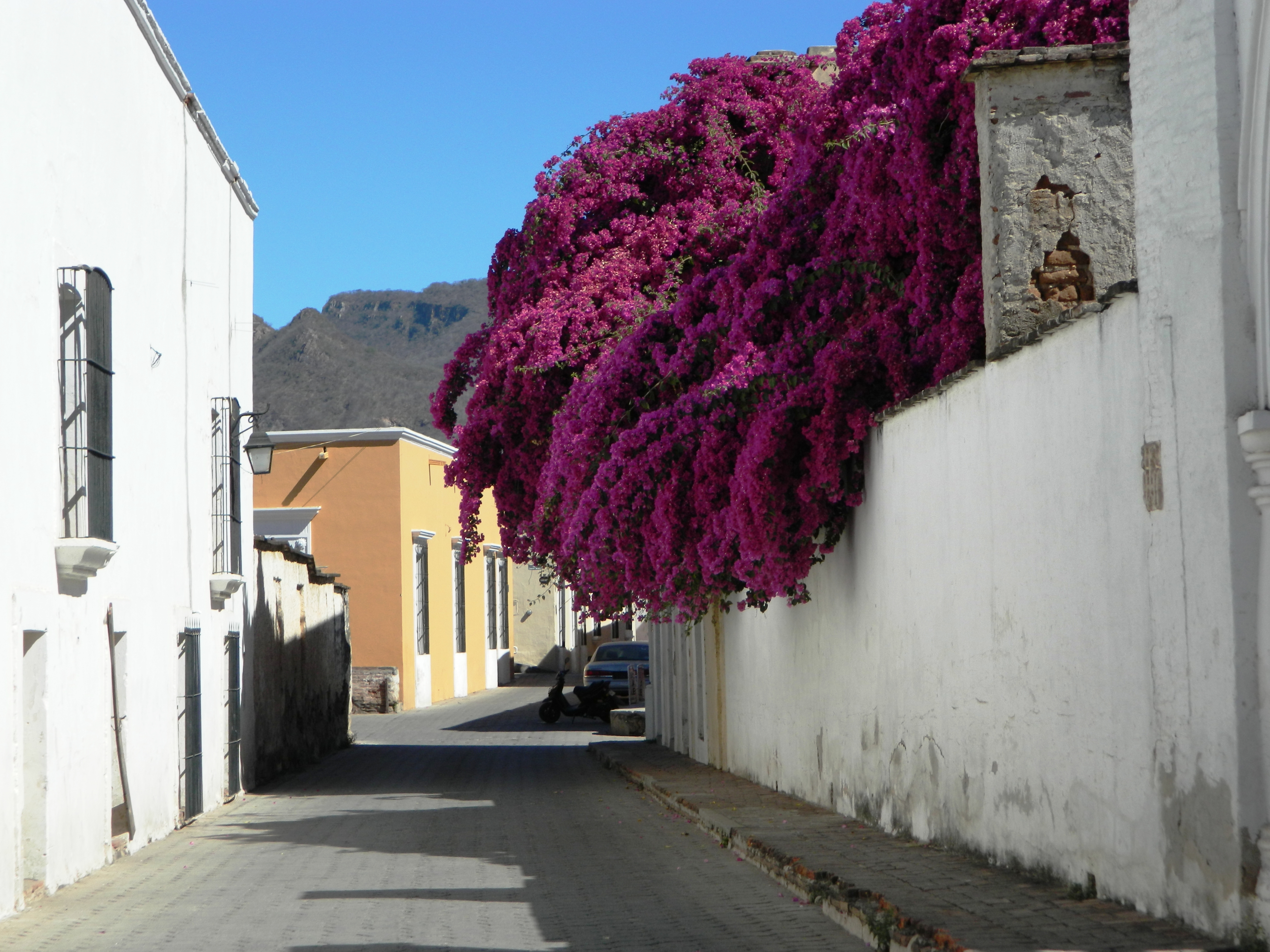
Bougainvilleas

== Government ==
You can see a list of municipal presidents of Álamos

== Notable people ==
- José Rafael Campoy, Mexican Jesuit, teacher, scholar, and theologian
- María Félix, film actress
- José Vicente Feliz, early settler of Los Angeles and namesake of Los Feliz, born in Álamos around 1741
- Gloria Fonda, silent film actress (died in Álamos in 1978)
- María Jesús Guirado Ibarra, politician
- Arturo Márquez, composer
- Álvaro Obregón, a general in the Mexican Revolution and President of Mexico
- Alfonso Ortiz Tirado, physician, tenor, and philanthropist
- Leopoldo Verdugo Quiroz, politician, inaugural Senator for Baja California
- David Zepeda, actor
- Félix María Zuloaga, former President of Mexico

=== Sister City ===
- Scottsdale, Arizona, United States

=== Planet Mars ===
The name Álamos has been used for a crater on the planet Mars by the International Astronomical Union, although not specifically commemorating the town.
