= Mexican dry forests =

Mexican dry forest describes a number of ecoregions of Mexico within the dry broadleaf forest Biome. Together they constitute a World Wildlife Fund Global 200 priority ecoregions area for conservation.

== Ecoregions ==
The area includes the dry forest ecoregions of Mexico's Pacific Ocean Coast from Sinaloa and the southern Baja California peninsula south to Guatemala.

North to south, they include:

- Jalisco dry forests
- Balsas dry forests
- Bajío dry forests
- Chiapas Depression dry forests
- Sonoran-Sinaloan transition subtropical dry forest,
- Southern Pacific dry forests
- Sinaloan dry forests
- Sierra de la Laguna dry forests.

== See also ==
- Ecoregions of Mexico

== References and external links ==
- Mexican dry forests (National Geographic)
- World Wildlife Fund & C.Michael Hogan. 2011. Jalisco dry forests. Encyclopedia of Earth, National Council for Science and the Environment, Washington DC. eds M.McGinley and C.J.cleveland
