= Casey B. Mulligan =

American economist and author

Casey Mulligan
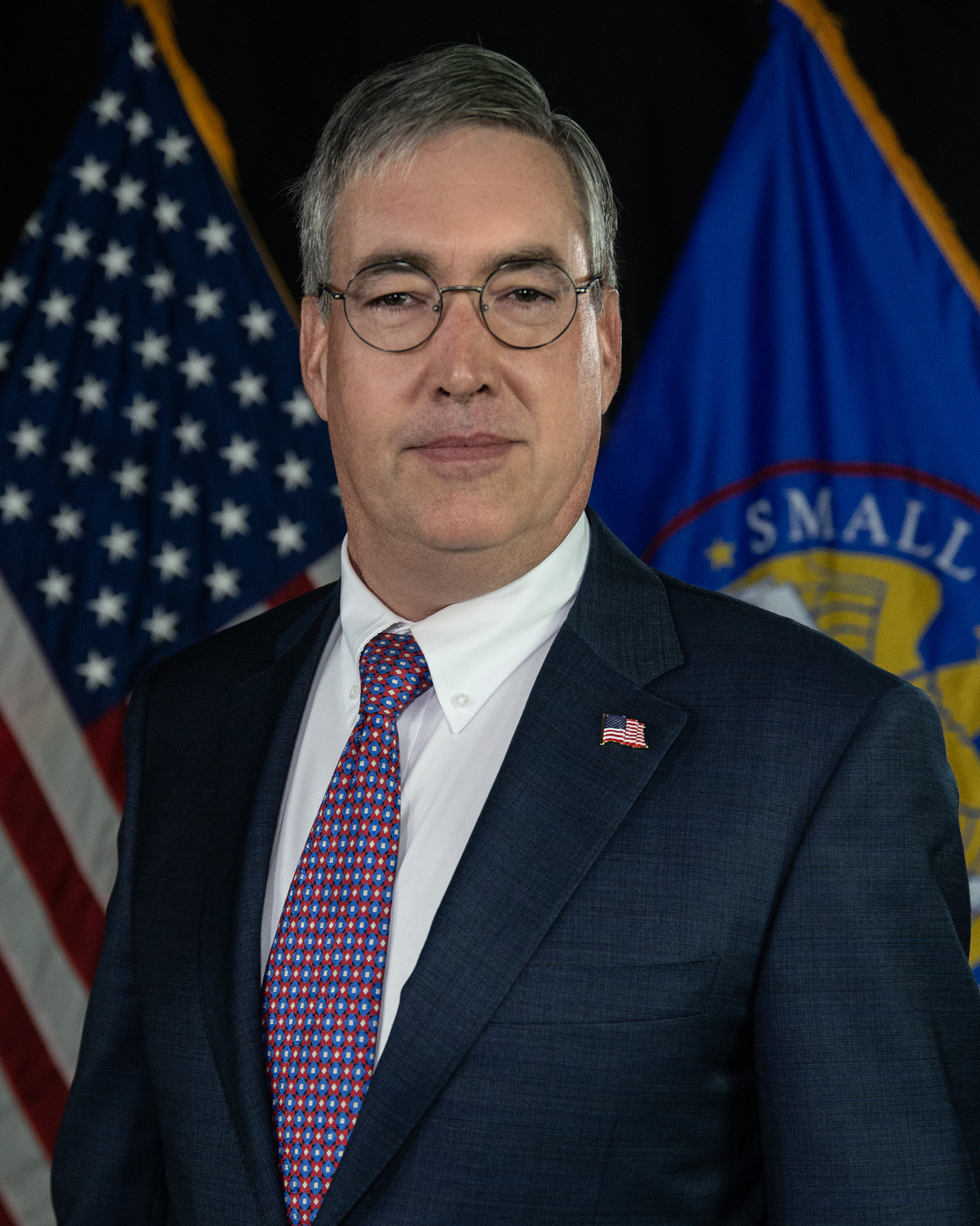

Chief Economist and Regulatory Officer of the United States Department of Health and Human Services
- Incumbent
- Assumed office April 17, 2026
- President: Donald Trump

Personal details
- Education: Harvard University (BA); University of Chicago (PhD)

Academic work
- Discipline: Economics
- Institutions: University of Chicago; Harvard University; Clemson University

Casey B. Mulligan is an American economist and author. He is a professor in economics at the University of Chicago. He served as chief economist for the Council of Economic Advisers in the Trump Administration from September 6, 2018, to August 2019. Mulligan also served as Chief Counsel for Advocacy at the Small Business Administration from August 5, 2025 until April 2026 under the second Trump Administration. In April 2026, Secretary of Health and Human Services Robert F. Kennedy Jr. appointed Mulligan as the Chief Economist and Regulatory Officer at the Department of Health and Human Services.

== Education ==
After earning a Bachelor of Arts from Harvard University, Mulligan earned a PhD in economics from the University of Chicago in 1993. After completing his PhD, he became a Postdoctoral Fellow at the University of Chicago before starting a tenure-track in 1994.

== Career ==
Mulligan has worked as a visiting professor at Harvard University, Clemson University, and the Harris School of Public Policy Studies. He has written articles for RealClearPolitics, Newsweek, The Washington Times, and National Review. Mulligan also wrote for Economix, a New York Times blog.

In 2012, Mulligan published The Redistribution Recession which argued that social welfare programs such as food stamps and unemployment benefits during the Great Recession disincentivized work and thus prolonged the recession. Mulligan has argued that the Patient Protection and Affordable Care Act ("Obamacare") disincentivizes work. Mulligan opposes paid sick days, arguing that they lead workers to take sick days even when they are not sick.

In 2020, he published You’re Hired!: Untold Successes and Failures of a Populist President, which praises President Trump's skills and his administration's policies. With Trump economic advisor Kevin Hassett, he co-authored an analysis of Biden's economic program during the 2020 presidential election.
