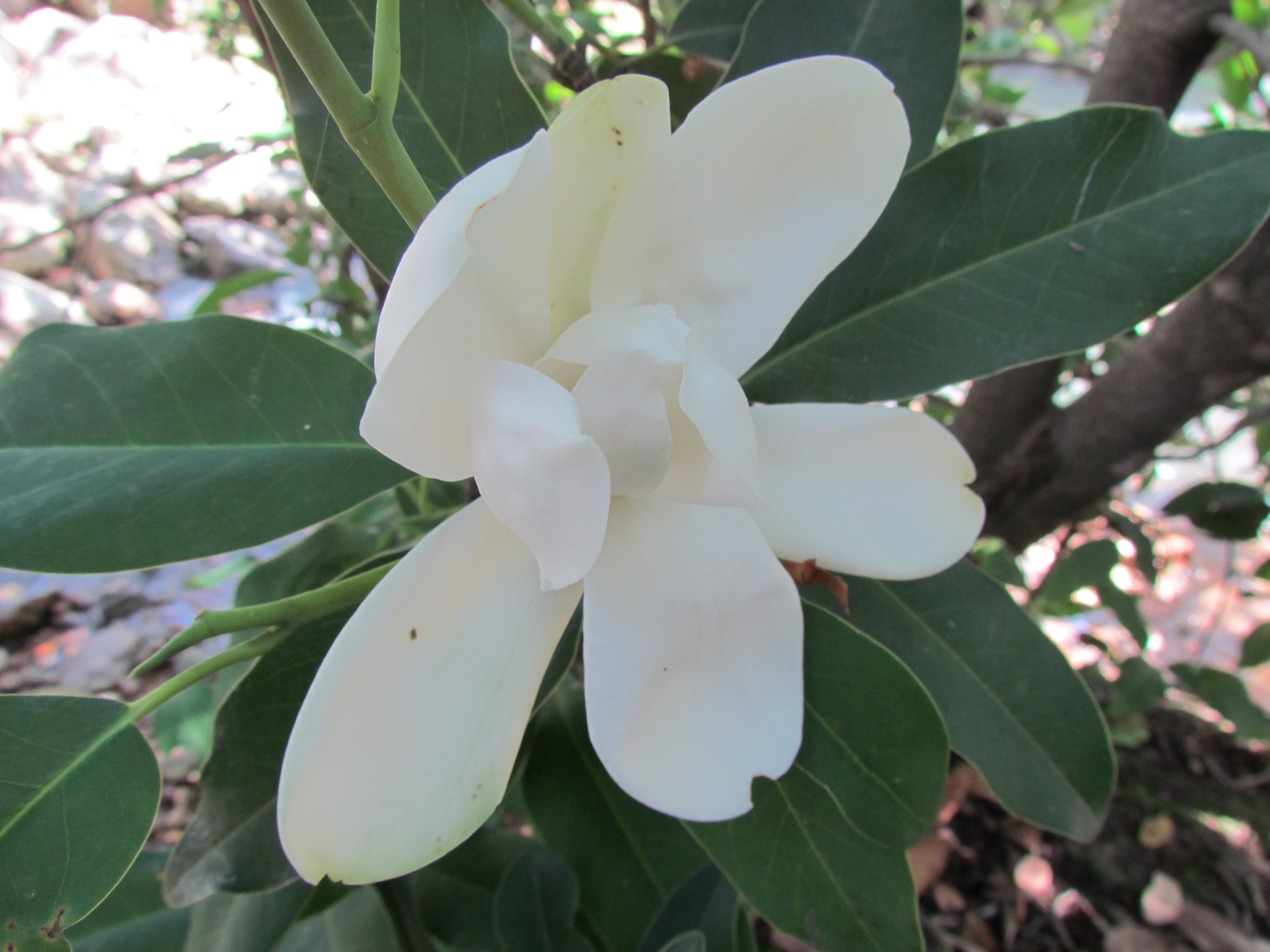

Conservation status
- Endangered (IUCN 3.1)

Scientific classification
- Kingdom: Plantae
- Clade: Embryophytes
- Clade: Tracheophytes
- Clade: Angiosperms
- Clade: Magnoliids
- Order: Magnoliales
- Family: Magnoliaceae
- Genus: Magnolia
- Section: Magnolia sect. Magnolia
- Species: M. pacifica

Binomial name
- Magnolia pacifica A.Vázquez

= Magnolia pacifica =

Species of flowering plant

Magnolia pacifica is a species of Magnolia from Jalisco and Nayarit states in western Mexico.

== Description ==
Magnolia pacifica is a medium-sized tree, growing 15 to 25 meters (49 to 82 ft) tall, with a trunk up to 40–80 cm (16–31 in) in diameter.

== Range and habitat ==
Magnolia pacifica is found only in a few locations in the mountains of Nayarit and western Jalisco states in western Mexico. In Nayarit it has been recorded at Acaponeta in the southern Sierra Madre Occidental and in the Sierra de San Juan. In Jalisco it is found in the mountains around San Sebastián del Oeste and in the Sierra el Cuale south and west of Talpa de Allende.

It most often occurs in cloud forest, but is also found in humid locations, like gorges and ravines, in pine-oak forest, tropical evergreen forest, and tropical semi-evergreen forest, between 790 and 2,250 meters elevation.

The species' extent of occurrence is 4,732 km^{2}.

== Conservation ==
The species is threatened by habitat loss from deforestation and conversion of its habitat to agriculture. Its population is decreasing, and its conservation status is assessed as Endangered.

== Systematics ==
Magnolia pacifica belongs to sect. Magnolia. Other closely related species live in western Mexico, and constitute the Magnolia pacifica group – Magnolia pugana from the mountains north of Guadalajara, and Magnolia vallartensis from the Pacific lowlands around Puerto Vallarta. M. pugana and M. vallartensis are sometimes classed as subspecies of M. pacifica.

Vázquez-García et al. consider the Sierra el Cuale population of M. pacifica to be separate species, M. talpana.
