= Sinaloan dry forests =

Tropical dry broadleaf forest ecoregion in Mexico

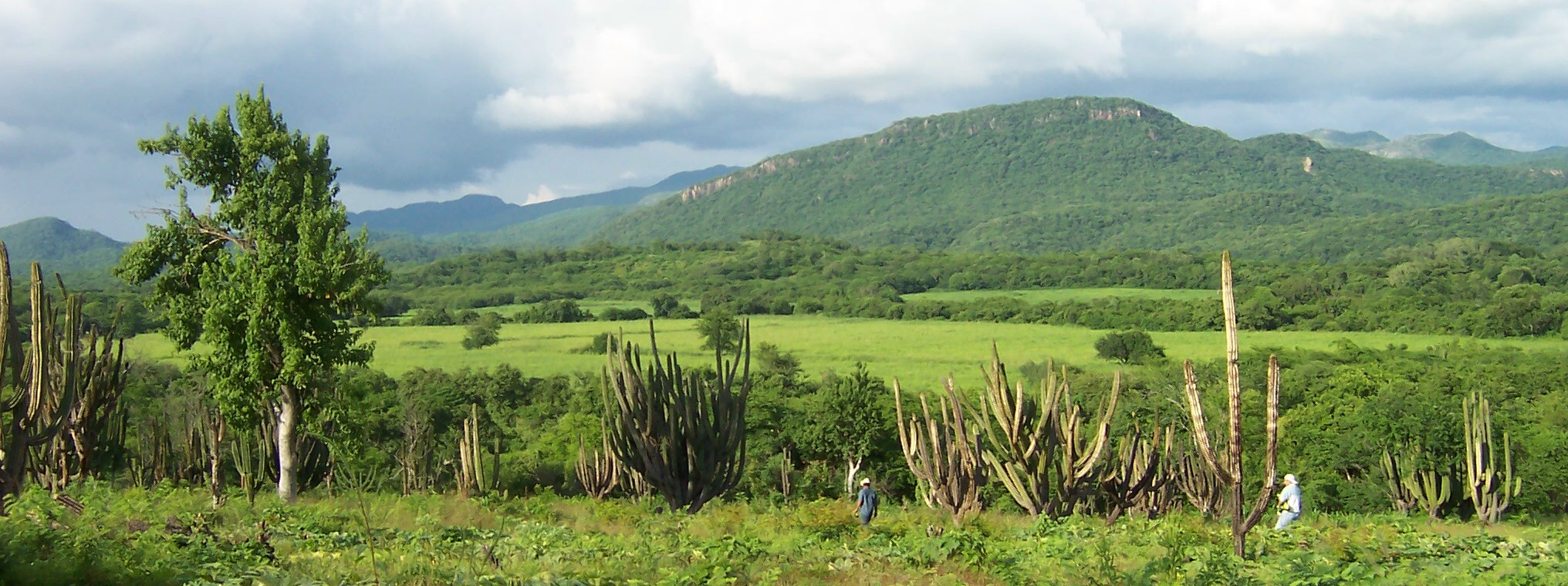
- View from Acatitán, Sinaloa, Mexico

- The map of Sinaloan dry forests ecoregion

Ecology
- Realm: Neotropical
- Biome: tropical and subtropical dry broadleaf forests
- Borders: List: Bajío dry forests; Central Mexican matorral; Jalisco dry forests; Marismas Nacionales-San Blas mangroves; Meseta Central matorral; Sierra Madre Occidental pine-oak forests; Sonoran-Sinaloan transition subtropical dry forests; Trans-Mexican Volcanic Belt pine-oak forests

Geography
- Area: 77,201 km^{2} (29,807 sq mi)
- Country: Mexico
- States: Sinaloa; Nayarit; Chihuahua; Jalisco, Sonora

Conservation
- Conservation status: Critical/endangered
- Global 200: Mexican dry forests
- Protected: 7,815 km^{2} (10%)

The Sinaloan dry forests is a tropical dry broadleaf forest ecoregion in western Mexico. It is the northernmost ecoregion of the Neotropical realm.

== Geography ==
The ecoregion covers an area of approximately 29,900 sq mi (77,000 km^{2})

The dry forests lie in the coastal plain and foothills between the Pacific Ocean and the pine-oak forests of the Sierra Madre Occidental, covering most of Sinaloa and Nayarit states and extending into portions of adjacent Sonora, Chihuahua, and Jalisco states.

To the north, the Sonoran–Sinaloan transition subtropical dry forest is a transition between the Sinaloan dry forests and the Sonoran Desert. On the south, the dry forests transition to the coastal Jalisco dry forests southwest of the Río Grande de Santiago, and the interior Bajío dry forests to the southeast.

A number of rivers cross the ecoregion from origins in the Sierra Madre Occidental to empty into the Pacific. These include, from north to south, the Fuerte, Sinaloa, Culiacán, San Lorenzo, Elota, Piaxtla, Presidio, Baluarte, Acaponeta, San Pedro Mezquital, and Grande de Santiago rivers. In the mountains the dry forests extend into the river canyons, and in the lowlands the rivers support riparian forests. Extensive lagoon and estuary systems along the coast are home to wetlands and mangroves.

== Climate ==
The climate is semi-arid to semi-humid, generally drier near the coast and becoming more humid in the foothills. Rainfall is highly seasonal, with an October to June dry season.

== Flora ==
Plant communities include thorn forests in the coastal lowlands, and dry deciduous forests in foothills of the Sierra Madre Occidental.

Thorn forests are characterized by dense growth of scrubby trees and shrubs. Spiny leguminous trees, particularly Acacia, are predominant. High stands of trees, including species of Brosimum, Ficus, and Enterolobium, are found along stream bottoms.

The predominant plant community of the foothills is short-statured, seasonally deciduous forest. Common plants include Handroanthus impetiginosus, tree morning-glory (Ipomoea arborescens), cuajilote (Pseudobombax palmeri), Bursera laxiflora, and Conzattia sericia, along with species of Montanoa, Bursera, Acacia, Cassia, and Lysiloma. In the mountain canyons higher up are taller-statured forests, with Ceiba acuminata, Bursera simaruba, Lysiloma divaricatum, and Psidium sartorianum as the dominant trees, covered in abundant lianas and epiphytes.

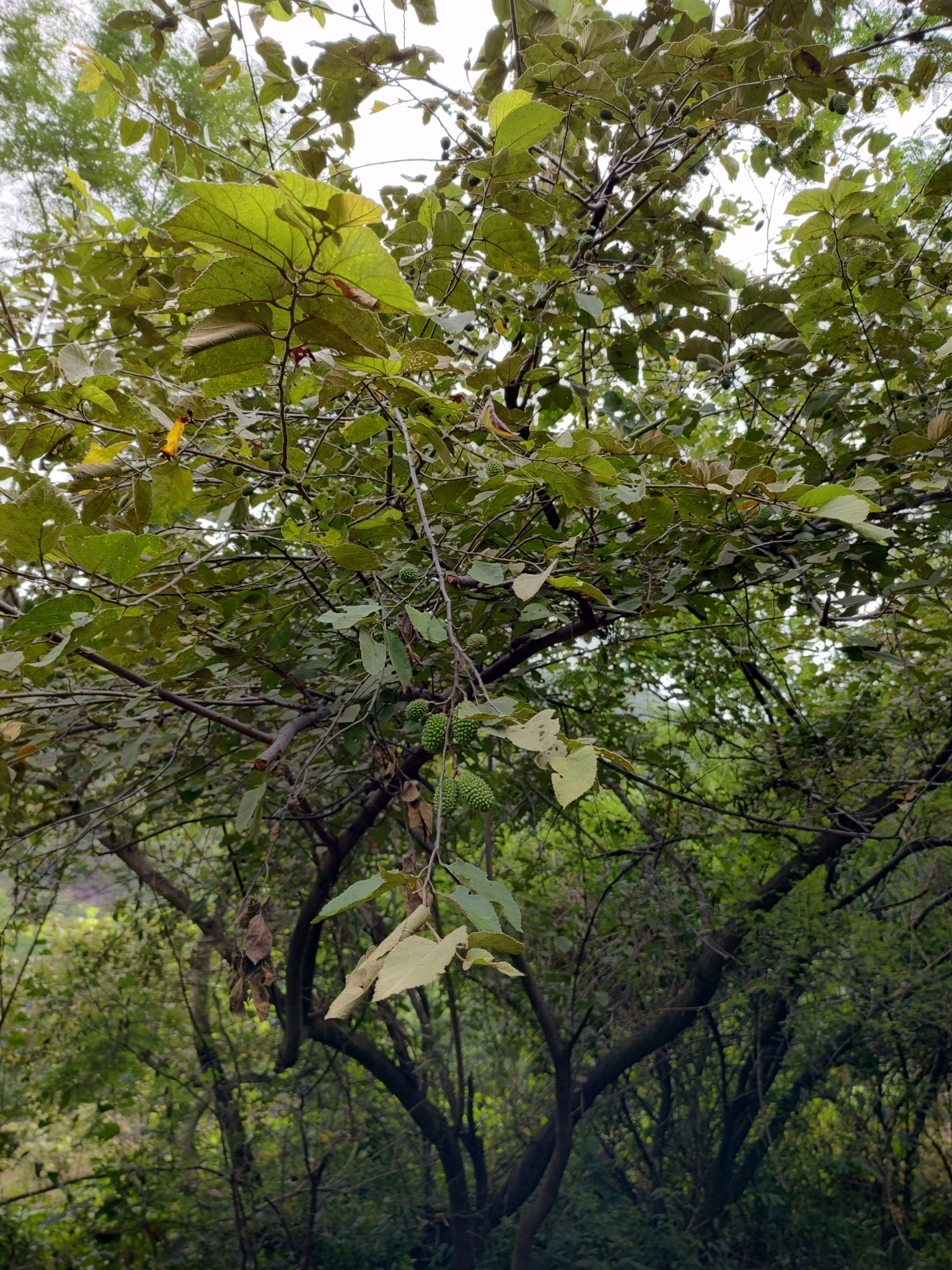
Guazuma ulmifolia in Guadalajara, Jalisco

== Fauna ==
Large mammals include white-tailed deer (Odocoileus virginianus), javelina (Tayassu tajacu), jaguar (Panthera onca), coyote (Canis latrans), ocelot (Leopardus pardalis pardalis), jaguarundi (Herpailurus yagouaroundi), gray fox (Urocyon cinereoargenteus nigrirostris), raccoon (Procyon lotor mexicanus), and white-nosed coati (Nasua narica molaris).

Native birds characteristic of the dry forests include the rufous-bellied chachalaca (Ortalis wagleri), Orange-fronted parakeet (Aratinga canicularis), Citreoline trogon (Trogon citreolus), russet-crowned motmot (Momotus mexicanus), streak-backed oriole (Icterus pustulatus), Mexican cacique (Cacicus melanicterus), thick-billed kingbird (Tyrannus crassirostris), Sinaloa wren (Thryothorus sinaloae), Mexican woodnymph (Eupherusa ridgwayi), Mexican parrotlet (Forpus cyanopygius), Sinaloa crow (Corvus sinaloae), San Blas jay (Cyanocorax sanblasianus), purplish-backed jay (Cyanocorax beecheii), black-throated magpie-jay (Calocitta colliei), rufous-backed thrush (Turdus rufopalliatus), and elegant quail (Callipepla douglasii).

Native reptiles include the Rio Fuerte beaded lizard (Heloderma exasperatum), clouded anole (Anolis nebulosus), Sinaloan milk snake (Lampropeltis triangulum sinaloae), filetail ground snake (Sonora aemula), indigo snake or babatuco (Drymarchon corais), Mexican short-tailed snake (Sympholis lippiens), blunthead tree snake (Imantodes gemmistratus), Mexican moccasin, pichecuate or cantíl (Agkistrodon bilineatus), and Mexican west coast rattlesnake (Crotalus basiliscus).

Native amphibians include Smith's pygmy robber frog (Craugastor hobartsmithi).

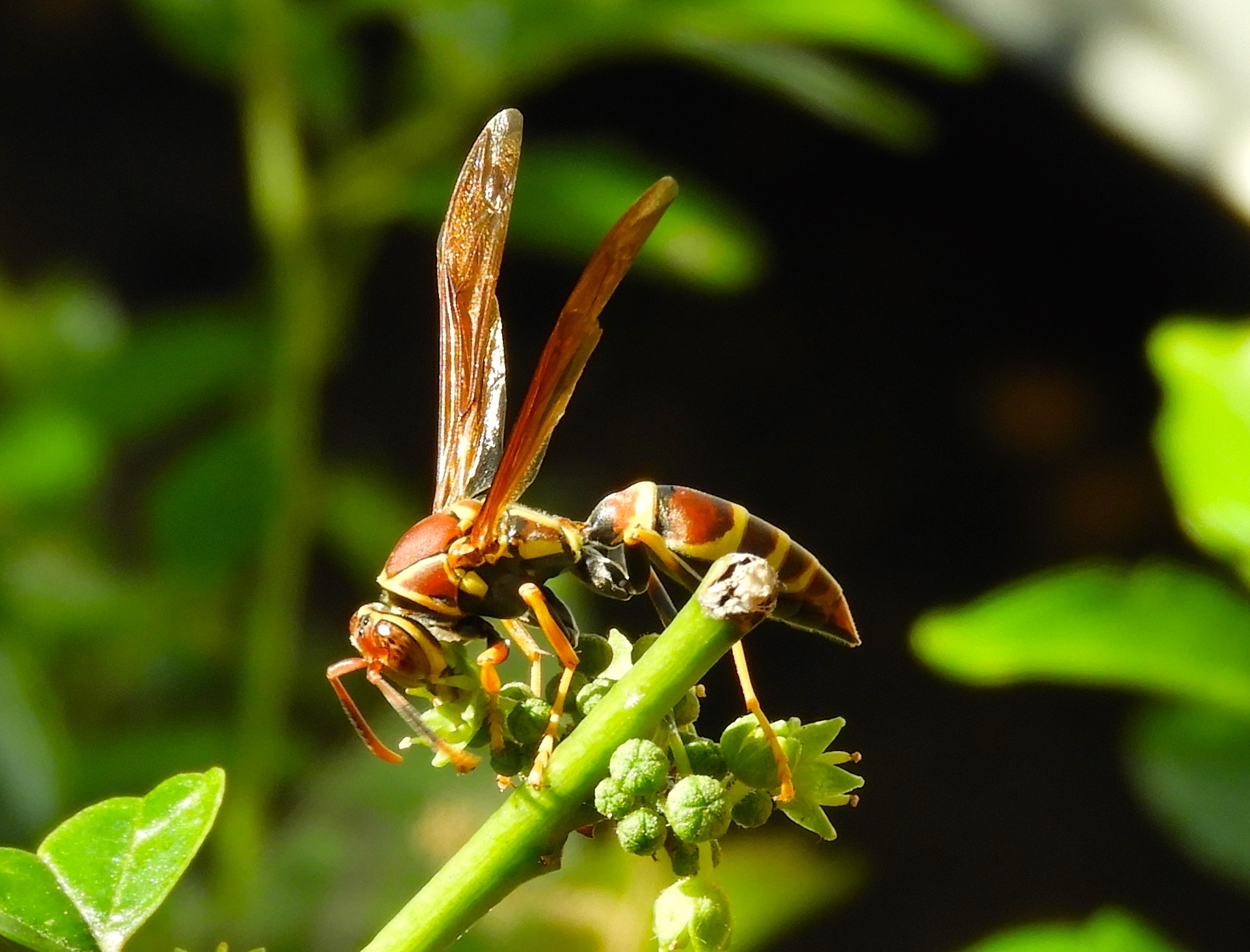
Polistes instabilis in Mazatlán, Sinaloa

== Protected areas ==
11% of the ecoregion is in protected areas. Protected areas include Cascada de Basaseachi National Park, Sierra de Álamos–Río Cuchujaqui Flora and Fauna Protection Area, Meseta de Cacaxtla Flora and Fauna Protection Area, and Tutuaca Flora and Fauna Protection Area. There are several designated Ramsar sites (wetlands of international importance) in the ecoregion, including Marismas Nacionales and the Ceuta Lagoon system.

== See also ==
- List of ecoregions in Mexico
