= Álamos Municipality =

Álamos
- Municipality
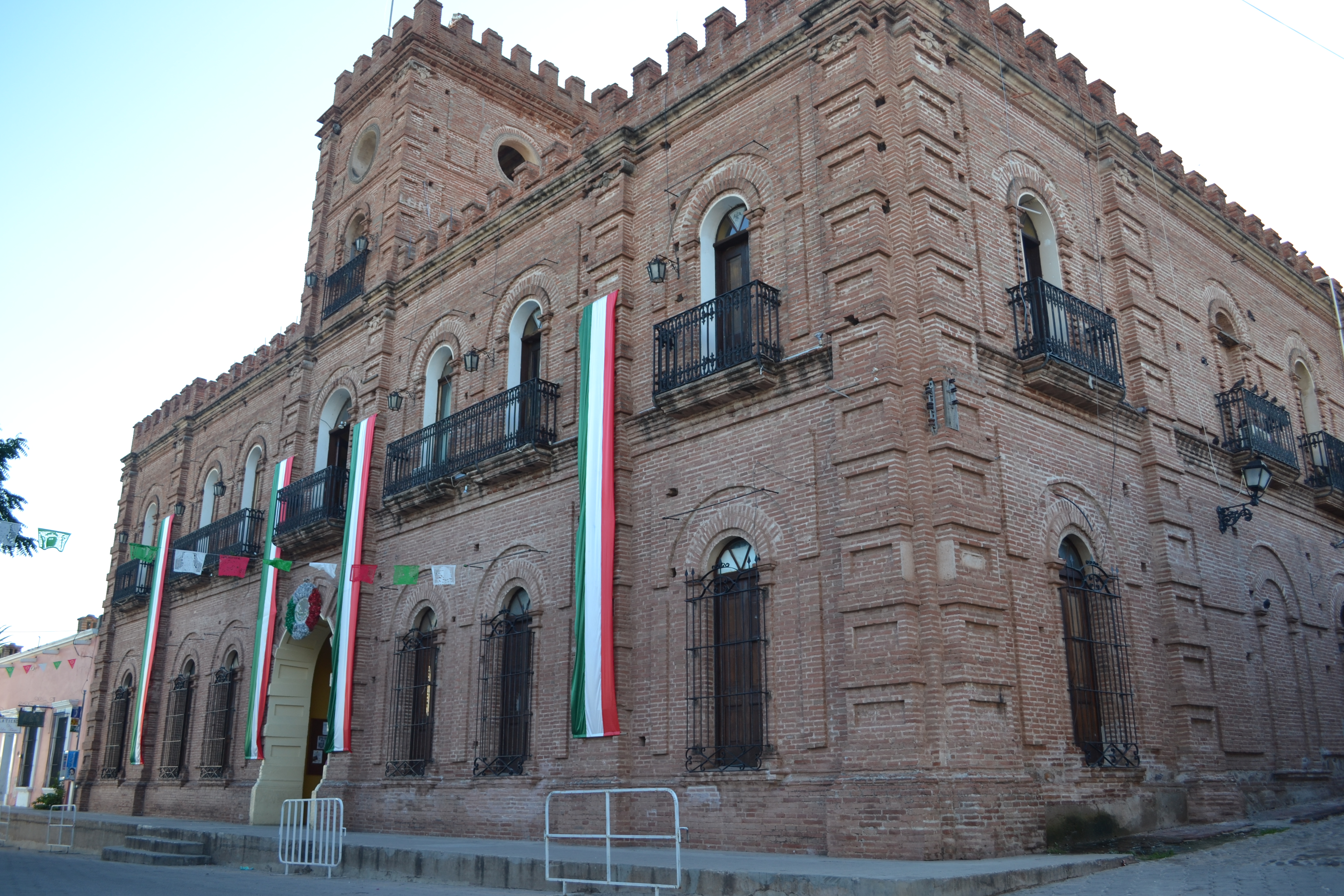
- Municipal Palace, Álamos

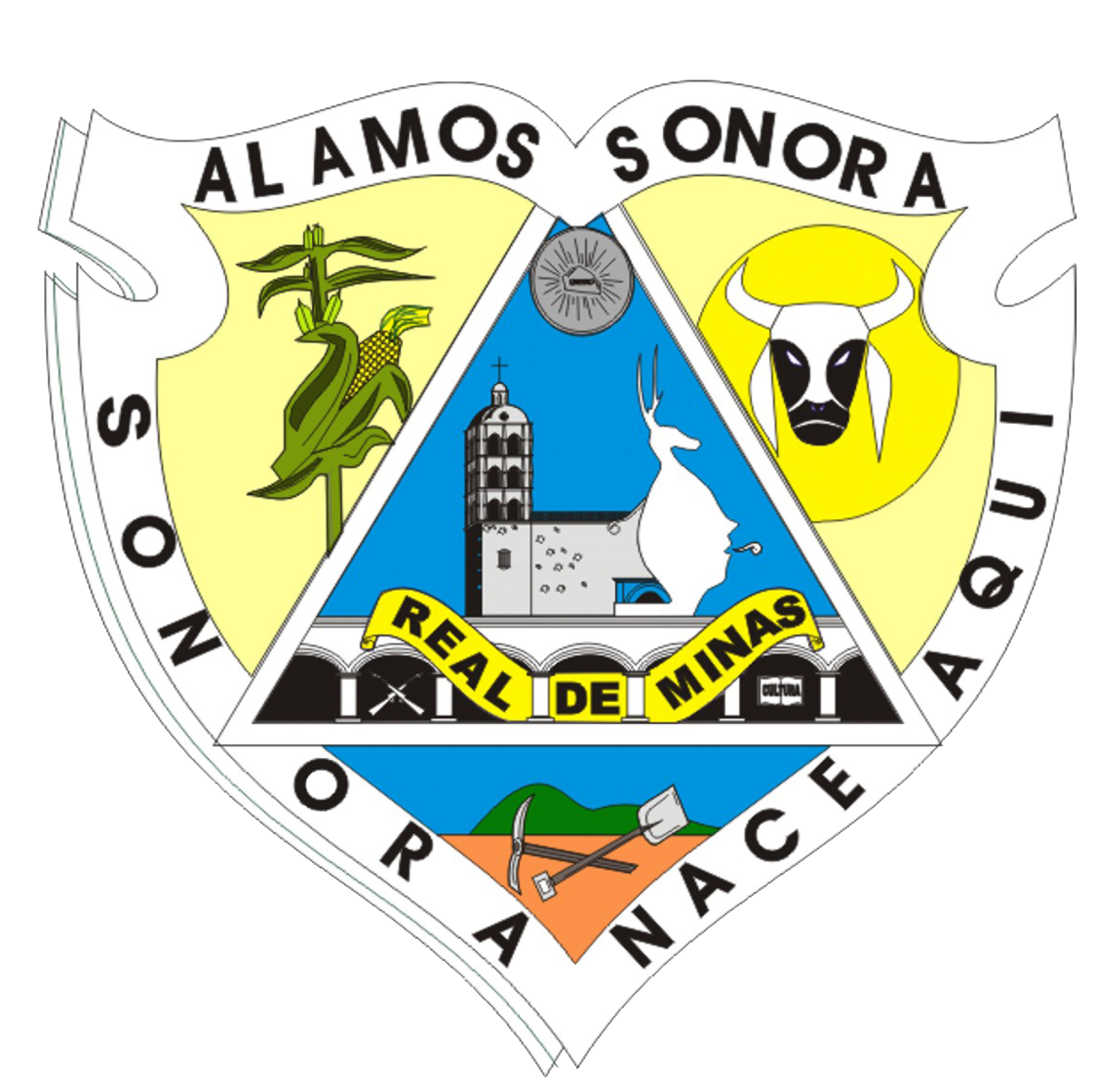
- Coat of arms

- Location of the municipality in Sonora

- Location within Mexico Location within Sonora
- Coordinates: 27.0185°N 108.9348°W
- Country: Mexico
- State: Sonora
- Municipal seat: Álamos, Sonora

Population (2020)
  - Total: 24,976
- Time zone: UTC-07:00 (Zona Pacífico)

Álamos is a municipality in south-western Sonora, Mexico. It includes the town of Álamos.

It is one of the 72 municipalities of the state of Sonora, located in the southeastern part of the state. Its municipal seat is the Magical Town of Álamos. Other important localities are: San Bernardo, El Mocúzarit (Conicárit), Los Tanques, among others. There are also a number of communities with the presence of Guarijíos and Mayos indigenous peoples, such as Mesa Colorada, Guajaray, Bavícora, El Paso, and Basiroa.

It was decreed an independent municipality in 1813, at the same time as another large number of municipalities, in the first political division of Sonora as a state, through the Spanish Constitution of Cádiz. At that time the municipality ceased to be part of the province of Sinaloa. According to the Population and Housing Census 2020 carried out by the National Institute of Statistics and Geography (INEGI), the municipality has a total population of 24,976 inhabitants, has an area of 6,426.22 km^{2}, being the sixth largest municipality in Sonora. Like most municipalities in the state, the name was given by its municipal seat. Its Gross Domestic Product per capita is US$6,800 and its Human Development Index (HDI) is 0.7560.

== Government ==
=== Municipal presidents ===
Term	Municipal president	Political party	Notes
1857–1858	Bartolomé Eligio Almada Salido		One-year terms, up until 1925
1858–1859	Antonio Benigno Almada		
1859–1860	Mateo Ortiz		
1860–1861	Vicente Ortiz		
1861–1862	Francisco Obregón Gómez		
1862–1863	Ignacio de S. Palomares Campoy		
1863–1864	Ignacio de S. Palomares Campoy		
1864–1865	Carlos E. Gaxiola		
1865–1866	Carlos E. Gaxiola		
1866–1867	Ramón Salazar		
1867–1868	Eugenio Ortiz		
1868–1869	Manuel Moreno		
1869–1870	Jesús Antonio Almada		
1870–1871	Bartolomé Eligio Almada Salido		
1871–1872	Quirino Corbalá		
1872–1873	Severiano Talamante		
1873–1874	Antonio Goycolea		
1874–1875	Quirino Corbalá		
1875–1876	Francisco Salido		
1876–1877	Rafael Acuña		
1877–1878	Quirino Corbalá		
1878–1879	Quirino Corbalá		
1879–1880	Quirino Corbalá		
1880–1881	Quirino Corbalá		
1881–1882	Tranquilino Otero		
1882–1883	Quirino Corbalá		
1883–1884	Quirino Corbalá		
1884–1885	Quirino Corbalá		
1885–1886	Antonio Goycolea		
1886–1887	Quirino Corbalá		
1887–1888	Quirino Corbalá		
1888–1889	Ángel Almada		
1889–1890	Quirino Corbalá		
1890–1891	Pedro S. Salazar		
1891–1892	Ignacio Lorenzo Almada		
1892–1893	Quirino Corbalá		
1893–1894	Quirino Corbalá		
1894–1895	Ignacio Lorenzo Almada		
1895–1896	Ángel Almada		
1896–1897	Ignacio Lorenzo Almada		
1897–1898	Manuel Salazar y Perrón		
1898–1899	Ángel Almada		
1899–1900	Ignacio Lorenzo Almada		
1900–1901	Ignacio Lorenzo Almada		
1901–1902	Ignacio Lorenzo Almada		
1902–1903	Tranquilino Otero		
1903–1904	Ignacio Lorenzo Almada		
1904–1905	Ignacio Lorenzo Almada		
1905–1906	Ignacio Lorenzo Almada		
1906–1907	Pedro S. Salazar		
1907–1908	Alfredo J. Almada		
1908–1909	Ignacio Lorenzo Almada		
1909–1910	Ignacio Lorenzo Almada		
1910–1910	Alfredo J. Almada		When the Mexican Revolution broke out, this City Council was removed from office
1910–1911	Antonio Goycolea		
1911–1911	Joaquín S. Urrea		The elections were annulled
1911–1912	Rómulo Salido		This City Council replaced the previous one after the cancellation of elections
1912–1912	Miguel C. Urrea		The elections were annulled
1912–1913	Antonio G. Ávila		This City Council replaced the previous one after the cancellation of elections
1913–1914	Alfonso Goycolea		
1914–1915	Gabriel Rascón		
1915–1916	Rómulo Salido		
1916–1917	Enrique M. Rochín		
1917–1918	Rudecindo Valenzuela		
1918–1919	Ramón M. Salazar		
1919–1920	José Tirado		
1920–1921	Rudecindo Valenzuela		
1921–1922	Carlos G. Salido		
1922–1923	Ramón M. Salazar		
1923–1924	Hilario Palomares		
1924–1925	Leopoldo Acosta		End of one-year terms
1925–1927	Rafael S. Corbalá		First biennium
1927–1929	Miguel S. Urrea		
1929–1931	Rudecindo Valenzuela	PNR	
1931–1933	Luis Urrea	PNR	
1933–1935	Jesús Peral	PNR	
1935–17-08-1936	Manuel S. Corbalá	PNR	The Congress of the Union disappeared the Powers of the State of Sonora, and this City Council ceased its functions
18-08–1936-23-11-1936	Octaviano Carbajal	PNR	Acting municipal president
23-11-1936–23-02-1937	Carlos G. García	PNR	Acting municipal president
23-02-1937–15-09-1937	Alfonso Lara	PNR	Acting municipal president
1937–1939	José María Palomares	PNR	
1939–1941	Carlos G. García	PRM	
1941–1943	Leopoldo Acosta	PRM	Last biennium
1943–1946	Juan de Dios Urrea	PRM	First triennium
1946–1949	Marcelino Valenzuela	PRI	
1949–1952	Martín B. Salido	PRI	
1952–1955	Raymundo M. Robles	PRI	
1955–1958	Maximiliano Couvillier Atondo	PRI	
1958–1961	Marcelino Valenzuela Bustillos	PRI	
1961–1964	Lauro Franco Franco	PRI	
1964–1967	Diódoro Valenzuela Piña	PRI	
1967–1970	Baldomero Corral Álvarez	PRI	
1970–1973	Rosendo Venegas Reyes	PRI	
1973–1976	José Reyes Amarillas	PRI	
1976–1979	José de Jesús Gil Vega	PRI	
1979–1982	Darío Villarreal Valenzuela	PRI	
1982–1985	Humberto R. Franco Terán	PRI	
1985–1988	Miguel H. Ruiz Arzaga	PRI	
1988–1991	Enrique Ibarra Álvarez	PRI	
1991–1994	Jesús Baldomero Corral Valenzuela	PRI	
1994–1997	Alfonso Valenzuela Salido	PRI	
1997–2000	Humberto Arana Murillo	PRI	
2000–2003	José de Jesús Carballo Mendívil	PRI	
2003–2006	David Ramón Corral Valenzuela	PRI	
16-09-2006–15-09-2009	Ruth Acuña Rascón	PRI	
16-09-2009–15-09-2012	Joaquín Navarro Quijada	PAN	
16-09-2012–15-09-2015	José Benjamín Anaya Rosas	PRI; PVEM	
16-09-2015–15-09-2018	Axel Omar Salas Hernández	PRI; PVEM	
16-09-2018–22-04-2021	Víctor Manuel Balderrama Cárdenas	PRI; PVEM; Panal	Coalition "For an Honest and Effective Government". He applied for a temporary leave, to run for reelection in the elections of 06-06-2021
22-04-2021–15-06-2021	Everardo Enríquez Parra	PRI; PVEM; Panal	Coalition "For an Honest and Effective Government". Acting municipal president
16-06-2021–15-09-2021	Víctor Manuel Balderrama Cárdenas	PRI; PVEM; Panal	Coalition "For an Honest and Effective Government". Resumed office at the end of his temporary leave
16-09-2021–15-09-2024	Víctor Manuel Balderrama Cárdenas	PAN; PRI; PRD	Coalition "It Goes for Sonora". He was reelected on 06-06-2021
16-09-2024–	Samuel Borbón Lara	Morena; PVEM; PT; Panal Sonora; PES Sonora	
