= List of Mexican composers of classical music =

The following is a list of Mexican composers of classical music.

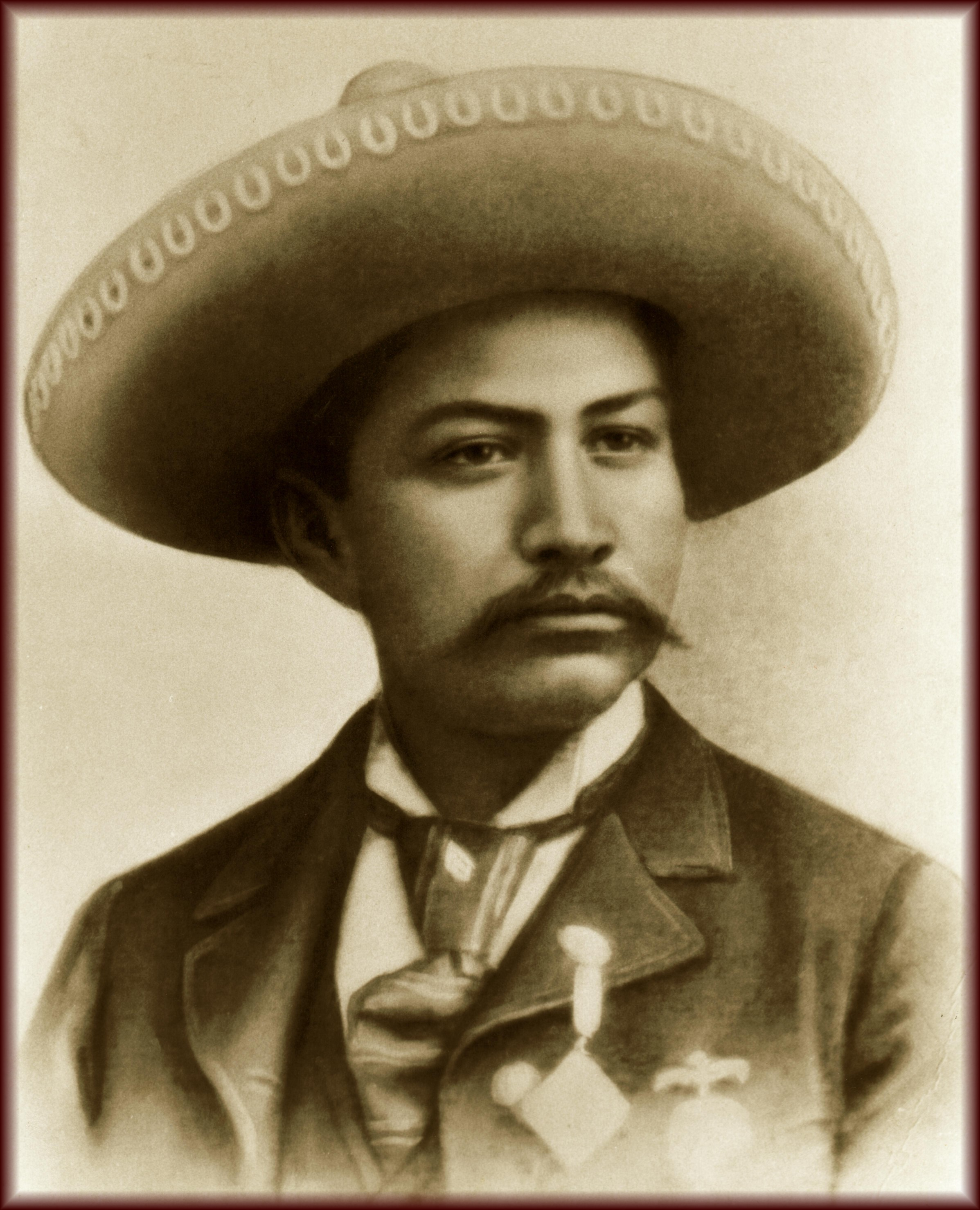
Juventino Rosas

== 17th–18th century ==
- Juan de Lienas (c. 1640)
- Francisco López Capillas (c. 1615 – 1673)
- Juan García de Zéspedes (c. 1619 – 1678)
- Manuel de Sumaya (1678–1755)
- José María Bustamante (1777–1861)
- José Mariano Elízaga (1786–1842)

== First half of the 19th century ==
- Cenobio Paniagua (1821–1882)
- Aniceto Ortega (1825–1875)
- Macedonio Alcalá (1831–1869)
- Melesio Morales (1839–1908)
- Guadalupe Olmedo (1853–1889)

== Second half of the 19th century ==
- Felipe Villanueva (1862–1893)
- Gustavo Campa (1863–1934)
- Ricardo Castro (1864–1907)
- Juventino Rosas (1868–1894)
- Miguel Lerdo de Tejada (1869–1941)
- Alfredo Carrasco (1875–1945)
- Julián Carrillo Trujillo (1875–1965)
- José Rolón (1876–1945)
- Manuel María Ponce (1882–1948)
- Arnulfo Miramontes (1882–1960)
- Candelario Huízar (1883–1970)
- Julia Alonso (1890–1977)
- José F. Vásquez (1896–1961)

== First half of the 20th century ==
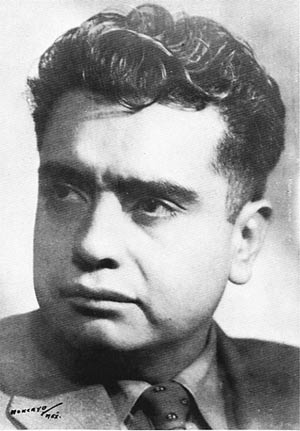
José Pablo Moncayo

- Carlos Chávez (1899–1978)
- Silvestre Revueltas (1899–1940)
- Eduardo Hernández Moncada (1899–1995)
- Alfonso de Elias (1902–1984)
- Luis Sandi (1905–1996)
- Higinio Ruvalcaba (1905–1976)
- Daniel Ayala Pérez (1906–1975)
- Miguel Bernal Jiménez (1910–1956)
- Blas Galindo (1910–1943)
- Salvador Contreras (1910–1982)
- Conlon Nancarrow (1912–1997)
- José Pablo Moncayo (1912–1958)
- Mario Ruiz Armengol (1914–2001)
- Luis Herrera de la Fuente (1916–2014)
- Carlos Jiménez Mabarak (1916–1994)
- Manuel Enríquez (1926–1994)
- Gloria Tapia (1927–2008)
- Joaquín Gutiérrez Heras (1927–2012)
- Francisco Savín (1929–2017)
- Hermilio Hernández (1931–2008)
- Rosa Guraieb (1931–2014)
- Manuel de Elías (1939)
- Eduardo Mata (1942–1995)
- María Grever (1885-1951)

== Second half of the 20th century ==
- Julio Estrada (born 1943)
- Mario Lavista (1943–2021)
- Graciela Agudelo (1945–2018)
- Max Lifchitz (1948)
- Daniel Catán (1949–2011)
- Arturo Márquez (1950)
- Marcela Rodríguez (1951)
- Eduardo Diazmuñoz (1953)
- Javier Álvarez (1956–2023)
- Guillermo Galindo (1960)
- Hilda Paredes (born 1957)
- Victor Rasgado (1959–2023)
- Ana Lara (1959)
- Ricardo Zohn-Muldoon (born 1962)
- Sergio Berlioz (1963)
- Carlos Sánchez-Gutierrez (1964)
- Armando Luna Ponce (1964–2015)
- Mariana Villanueva (1964)
- Gabriela Ortiz (1964)
- Juan Trigos (1965)
- Javier Torres Maldonado (1968)
- Ildemaro Correa Zavala (1969)
- Juan Sebastián Lach Lau (1970)
- Enrico Chapela (1974)
