= Lourdes Ambriz =

Mexican operatic soprano (1958–2025)

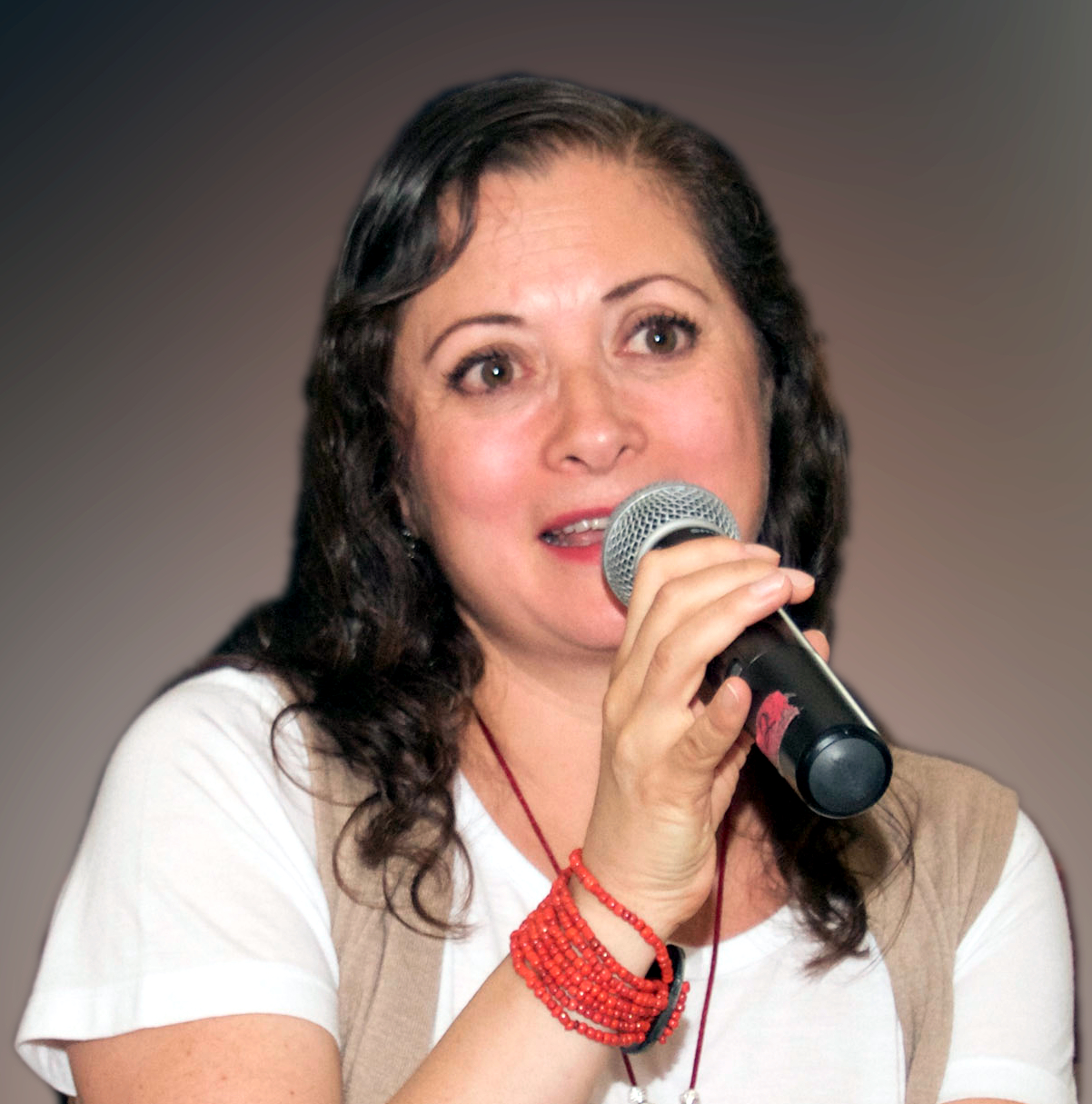
- Ambriz in 2016
- Born: 20 July 1958; Mexico City, Mexico
- Died: 28 August 2025 (aged 67); Mexico City, Mexico
- Occupations: Operatic soprano; Opera manager
- Years active: 1982–2024

Lourdes Ambriz Márquez (20 July 1958 – 28 August 2025) was a Mexican operatic soprano and opera manager. She was a leading singer of the national Ópera de Bellas Artes de México, and was the company's deputy artistic director from 2015 to 2017. Her work in opera spanned four decades, with a repertoire ranging from classical to contemporary, portraying many Mozart roles. She performed as a guest on stages in Europe and the Americas.

Her stage debut in Mexico took place in 1982, as Olympia in Offenbach's The Tales of Hoffmann. Ambriz made her European debut in Spain almost a decade later, creating the title role in Arrieta's Marina in 1991. She became more widely known for her singing role as Belle in the original Spanish-language Disney film Beauty and the Beast.

Throughout her career, Ambriz was dedicated to performing and recording works by Mexican composers. She later also worked as a professor at Panamerican University and helped assist public outreach efforts to expose new audiences in Mexico to opera for the first time.

== Life and career ==
Lourdes Ambriz was born in Mexico City on 20 July 1958. (Note: Other sources give 1961 as her birth year.) She took part in the 1980 Concurso Nacional de Canto Carlo Morell, achieving 4th place. She first appeared in June 1980 in a concert version of Verdi's Don Carlos with the Orquesta Sinfónica Nacional de Mexico, as Tebaldo and Voice from Heaven alongside Roberto Bañuelas, Malcolm Smith , and Eva Dobrowska. She performed beginner's roles such as the First Boy in Mozart's Die Zauberflöte and the Page in Verdi's Rigoletto.

She made her professional stage debut with the National Opera Company of the Instituto Nacional de Bellas Artes y Literatura (INBAL) in 1982 with the role of Olympia in Offenbach's The Tales of Hoffmann, conducted by Enrique Diemecke. Her voice was described as crystal. She performed as Gretel in Humperdinck's Hänsel und Gretel, Suor Genovieffa in Puccini's Suor Angelica, Nannetta in Verdi's Falstaff , and Oscar in Verdi's Un ballo in maschera. In 1985, she portrayed Najade in the Mexican premiere of Ariadne auf Naxos by R. Strauss, conducted by Eduardo Mata. She performed the title role of Gounod's Roméo et Juliette in 1987, as part of the Festival Cultural Sinaloa at the Teatro Pablo of Villavicencio, Colombia. She appeared as Zerlina in Mozart's Don Giovanni for the opening of the 1991/92 season at the Palacio de Bellas Artes. She performed as a guest at the Teatro Degollado in Guadalajara as both Despina in Mozart's Così fan tutte and as Musetta in Puccini's La Bohème. She repeated Zerlina at the 1997 Festival Internacional Cervantino in Guanajuato.

She also appeared as Euridice in Gluck's Orfeo ed Euridice and as El trujamán in de Falla's El retablo de maese Pedro. Her roles included Pamina in Die Zauberflöte, Susanna in Mozart's Le nozze di Figaro, Servilia in Mozart's La clemenza di Tito, Leila in Bizet's Les pêcheurs de perles, Micaëla in Bizet's Carmen, Gilda in Verdi's Rigoletto, Lauretta in Puccini's Gianni Schicchi , and Miss Jessel in Britten's The Turn of the Screw. Her partners on stage included Francisco Araiza, Alfredo Daza, Justino Díaz, Plácido Domingo, Fernando de la Mora, Ramón Vargas , and Rolando Villazón.

Ambriz performed with a number of the orchestras in Mexico and also sang with the Saint Paul Chamber Orchestra, the Dallas Symphony, the San Francisco Symphony, the National Centre for the Arts Orchestra of Canada, the Simón Bolívar Orchestra of Venezuela and the German Deutsche Kammerakademie.

In 1990 she toured Spain with the group of soloists from Mexico directed by Eduardo Mata. The same year she dubbed the songs from Disney's Beauty and the Beast (1991) as the singing voice (Note: Voice actress Diana Santos was the speaking voice of Belle in the 1991 Spanish-language version of Disney's Beauty and the Beast.) of the character Belle. The following year she made her operatic debut in Europe singing the title role of Emilio Arrieta's Marina at the Málaga Opera. In 1992 she toured twelve European countries. In 1993 she was invited to represent Mexico at the Europalia festival in Brussels. Also in 1993, she toured South America. In 1995, she toured the United States with the early music group Ars Nova.

In 2003 she portrayed Woglinde in the Mexican premiere of Wagner's Das Rheingold, adding in 2003 and 2006 the role of Ortlinde in Die Walküre.

In 2010 Ambriz sang the role of Eupaforice in the staging of Graun's opera Montezuma, which debuted in Germany. It was presented there by the Teatro de Ciertos Habitantes Company under the musical direction of Gabriel Garrido and the stage direction of Claudio Valdés Kuri. Her performance as Eupaforice in the Spanish premiere at the Teatro Real in Madrid was widely acclaimed, with Roberto Herrscher calling Ambriz the "best singer" in the entire production, "a soprano of superb talents". She premiered the operas Aura by Mario Lavista, Víctor Rasgado's El coyote y el conejo and Paso del Norte, Dunaxii by Roberto Morales, Malinalli by Manuel Henríquez Romero and The Seventh Seed by Hilda Paredes.

In 2014 she became deputy artistic director of the Compañía Nacional de Ópera. From 2015 to 2017 she was artistic director of the Ópera de Bellas Artes de México.

In 2021 she would provide the voice of the Siren in the series Frankelda's Book of Spooks, produced by her nephews Roy and Arturo Ambriz. She reprised the role in its 2025 film prequel I Am Frankelda.

Ambriz died on 28 August 2025 in a Mexico City hospital, aged 67. Media reported the cause as cancer. The Instituto Nacional de Bellas Artes y Literatura publicly confirmed her death on its social channels.

== Awards ==
Ambriz won twice in the Carlo Morelli Competition, first in 1980, followed by the second in 1981. She received the National Youth Award and the diploma of the Mexican Union of Theater and Music Chroniclers in 1987. Ambriz was awarded the Mozart Medal by the Austrian Embassy in Mexico in 2006. She received the Alfonso Ortiz Tirado Medal in 2023, followed by the Bellas Artes Medal in 2024, one of the highest honors in the arts in Mexico.

== Legacy ==
Upon her death, Mexican flautist Horacio Franco described Ambriz as one of the greatest opera singers in Mexico's history, next to Ángela Peralta, Fanny Anitúa, and Irma González. Ambriz was also known as an accomplished actress, with journalist Raúl Díaz reviewing her acting skills favorably after seeing her perform in Mozart's Bastien und Bastienne. Notable roles include Olympia in The Tales of Hoffmann, Susanna in Mozart's Le nozze di Figaro, Gilda in Verdi's Rigoletto, Pamina in Mozart's Die Zauberflöte, Juliette in Gounod's Roméo et Juliette, and Gretel in Humperdick's Hansel and Gretel.

Ambriz was devoted to performing and recording the music of Mexican composers throughout her long career. Her performance on Misa Mexicana (2009), an album of liturgical music by Mexican composer Jesús Echevarría, is rooted in the European baroque tradition, but also fuses together with and evokes traditional Mexican styles of music such as huapango and son mexicano. Music critic Juan Arturo Brennan estimates that Ambriz recorded and promoted works from at least 19 (Note: The list of Mexican composers Ambriz recorded includes: 1. Eduardo Angulo; 2. Jesús Echevarría; 3. Arturo González Martínez; 4. Enrique González Medina; 5. Rosa Guraieb; 6. Rodolfo Halffter; 7. Eduardo Hernández Moncada; 8. Mario Lavista; 9. Salvador Moreno; 10. Gerhart Muench; 11. Hilda Paredes; 12. Manuel M. Ponce; 13. Víctor Rasgado; 14. Silvestre Revueltas; 15. Marcela Rodríguez; 16. Luis Antonio Rojas; 17. José Rolón; 18. Jorge Torres Sáenz; 19. Eugenio Toussaint) composers in Mexico.

Ambriz was involved in public outreach to the broader music community in Mexico, especially to new opera listeners. She wrote a minimalist opera adaptation of The Elixir of Love by Gaetano Donizetti as part of the "Tell Me an Opera!" (¡Cuéntame una Ópera!) project, a national tour exposing audiences throughout her country to opera for the first time.
