= Grupo de los cuatro =

1935 alliance of Mexican composers

Grupo de los Cuatro (Group of the Four) is the name adopted by a group of four young Mexican composers in 1935, who organized together with the aim of propagating new music, particularly their own.

== History ==
Carlos Chávez, who had replaced Antonio Castro Leal as director of the Mexican Conservatorio Nacional de Música in 1928, set about revising the curriculum to increase the emphasis on writing music in all styles. In 1931, he received approval from the Secretariat of Public Education to inaugurate a course in free composition, at first titled Class of Musical Creation, later renamed Composition Workshop. The first students enrolled in this class included some older members, such as Vincente Mendoza, Candelario Huízar, and Silvestre Revueltas, but also three young students under the age of twenty, Daniel Ayala, Salvador Contreras, and José Pablo Moncayo. They were joined the next year by another pupil of their age group, Blas Galindo.

Early in 1933 Chávez abandoned the directorship of the Conservatory to assume the job of Chief of the Department of Fine Arts, a position he held for barely a year, after which he regained directorship of the Conservatory in May 1934. However, he only remained until December of that year, following the change of regime when Lázaro Cárdenas became president. Almost immediately on Chávez's departure, the composition course was dropped, prompting Ayala, Contreras, Galindo, and Moncayo to demonstrate the validity of the suppressed course by presenting a program of their own compositions. For this purpose, they organized in 1935 (on the initiation of Contreras) as the Grupo de Jóvenes Compositores (Group of Young Composers), and gave their first concert under this name on 25 November 1935. The works performed included two works by Contreras (the Sonata for Violin and Cello and Danza for piano) and two by Moncayo (the Sonatina for piano and Amatzinac for flute and string quartet). A newspaper review of this concert, published two days later, referred to them as the "Grupo de los Cuatro", with deliberate reference to the Russian "Mighty Five" and French "Les Six", and they adopted this as their name for their following concert on 26 March 1936 at the Teatro de Orientación. Their next program was a workers' concert, given on 17 June 1936, followed by their second "official" concert under the new name on 15 October 1936. This included the Quartet for four cellos by Galindo and two works by Moncayo: the Sonatina for violin and piano, and Romanza for piano trio.
