= National Symphony Orchestra (Mexico) =

Classical music and symphony orchestra

National Symphony Orchestra (OSN)
- Orchestra
- Former name: National Conservatory Symphony Orchestra, National Symphony, Mexico Symphony Orchestra
- Founded: 1881
- Location: Mexico City
- Concert hall: Palacio de Bellas Artes
- Principal conductor: Ludwig Carrasco
- Website: www.osn.bellasartes.gob.mx

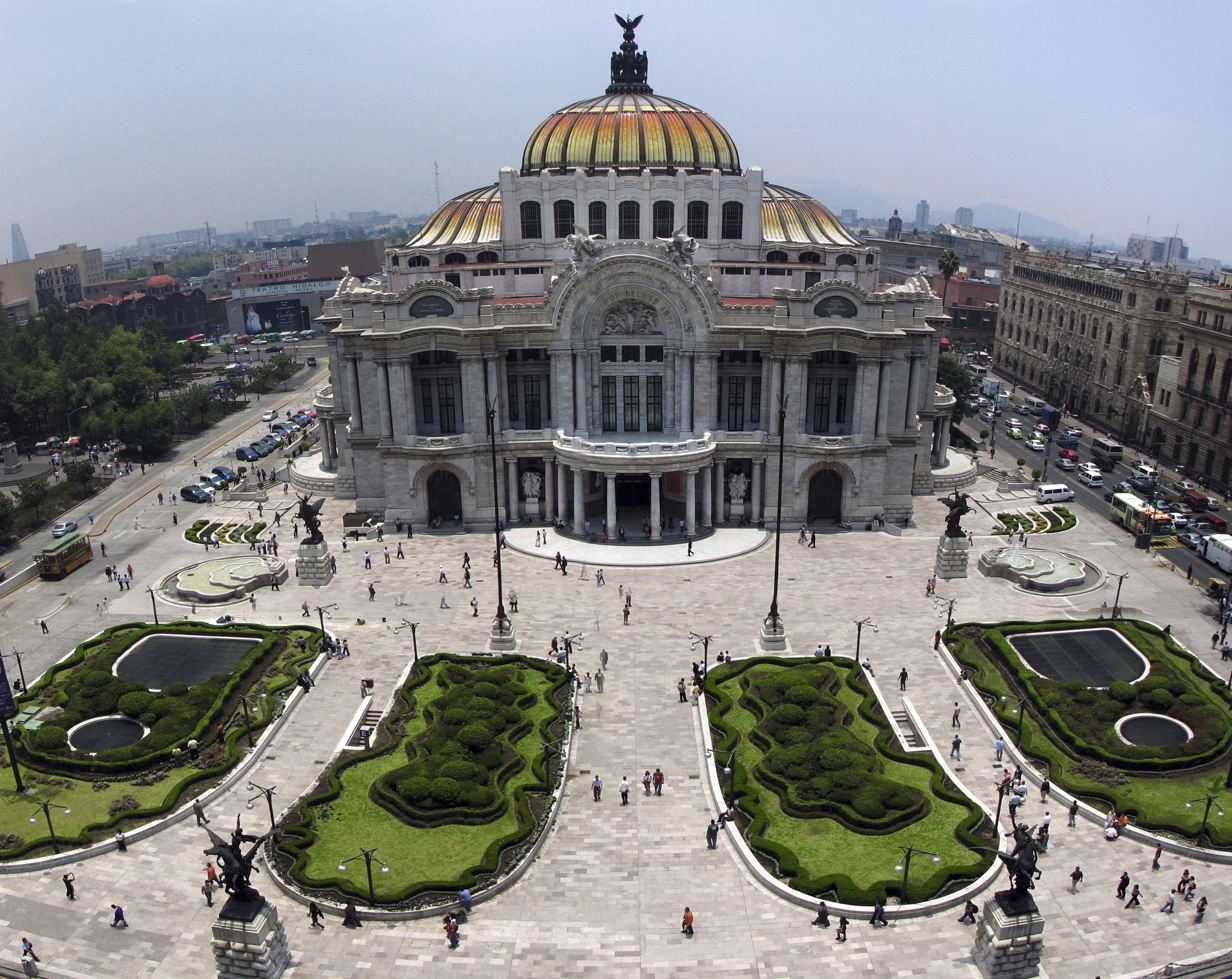
Palacio de Bellas Artes, Mexico City

The National Symphony Orchestra (Spanish: Orquesta Sinfónica Nacional, OSN) is the most important symphony orchestra in Mexico. With its origins traced back as 1881, along with the Boston Symphony Orchestra, it is the second-oldest symphony orchestra in the Western Hemisphere. The orchestra does not have a permanent venue but performs regularly in the Grand Hall of the Palace of Fine Arts (Palacio de Bellas Artes) in Mexico City.

Not to be confused with the Orquesta Sinfónica del Estado de México (OSEM) or Symphony Orchestra of the State of Mexico, founded in 1971, the National Symphony Orchestra of Mexico, as a branch of the Instituto Nacional de Bellas Artes, was created by presidential decree of Miguel Alemán on 18 July 1947, under the name of National Conservatory Symphony Orchestra. Before that, however, there was a predecessor orchestra known as the Symphony Orchestra of Mexico (September 2, 1928 – March 8, 1949), a nonprofit organization founded and conducted by Mexican composer, conductor, teacher, journalist and visionary arts leader Carlos Chávez. On 1 August 1947, Chávez appointed Blas Galindo as the new director of the National Conservatory, official seat of the new orchestra. Chávez reports that the National Symphony Orchestra gave its first official performance on 30 October 1947 at the Palace of Fine Arts, under the baton of Eduardo Hernández Moncada, its first music and artistic director.

Another decree on April 25, 1949, changed the name of the ensemble to National Symphony Orchestra (Orquesta Sinfónica Nacional or OSN); first, to emphasize its professional character—it had the best musicians in the country—and to avoid confusing it with a student ensemble, despite Chávez's having from the very beginning considered the orchestra a national symphony, linked in some aspects to the most important music education institution, the National Conservatory; and second, Chávez wanted to highlight that “a National Symphony, by definition, is a State institution,” and the government had recognized the need to support an institution of public interest.

== History of the Orchestra ==
The social context that Mexico was living during the beginnings of the 20th century made the task of creating an orchestra difficult, so there were several attempts to form a national symphony orchestra.

=== First period ===
The orchestra has its roots back in 1881, when Alfredo Bablot, director of the Music Conservatory (founded July 1, 1866) initiated the Conservatory Orchestra. When Bablot died, he was replaced by Carlos J. Menéses. In 1902 the orchestra had little support from the government of Porfirio Díaz, but it suspended its activities in 1913, two years after Díaz's fall, because of the general instability in the country during the Mexican Revolution.

=== Second and third period ===
After Gen. Venustiano Carranza took over the national government's seat back to Mexico City in 1915, the orchestra took the name of National Symphony, and depended from the Bellas Artes bureau, and its director during this period was Jesús Acuña, followed by composer Manuel M. Ponce but he declined and the orchestra suspended the concert seasons. Later, composer Julián Carrillo, who was a very important figure in music history worldwide, was appointed as the Music Conservatory director, and took up the project for an orchestra again, and depended from the Conservatory, but because of lack of financial support from the government, the orchestra again finished its activities in 1924.

=== Mexican Symphony Orchestra ===
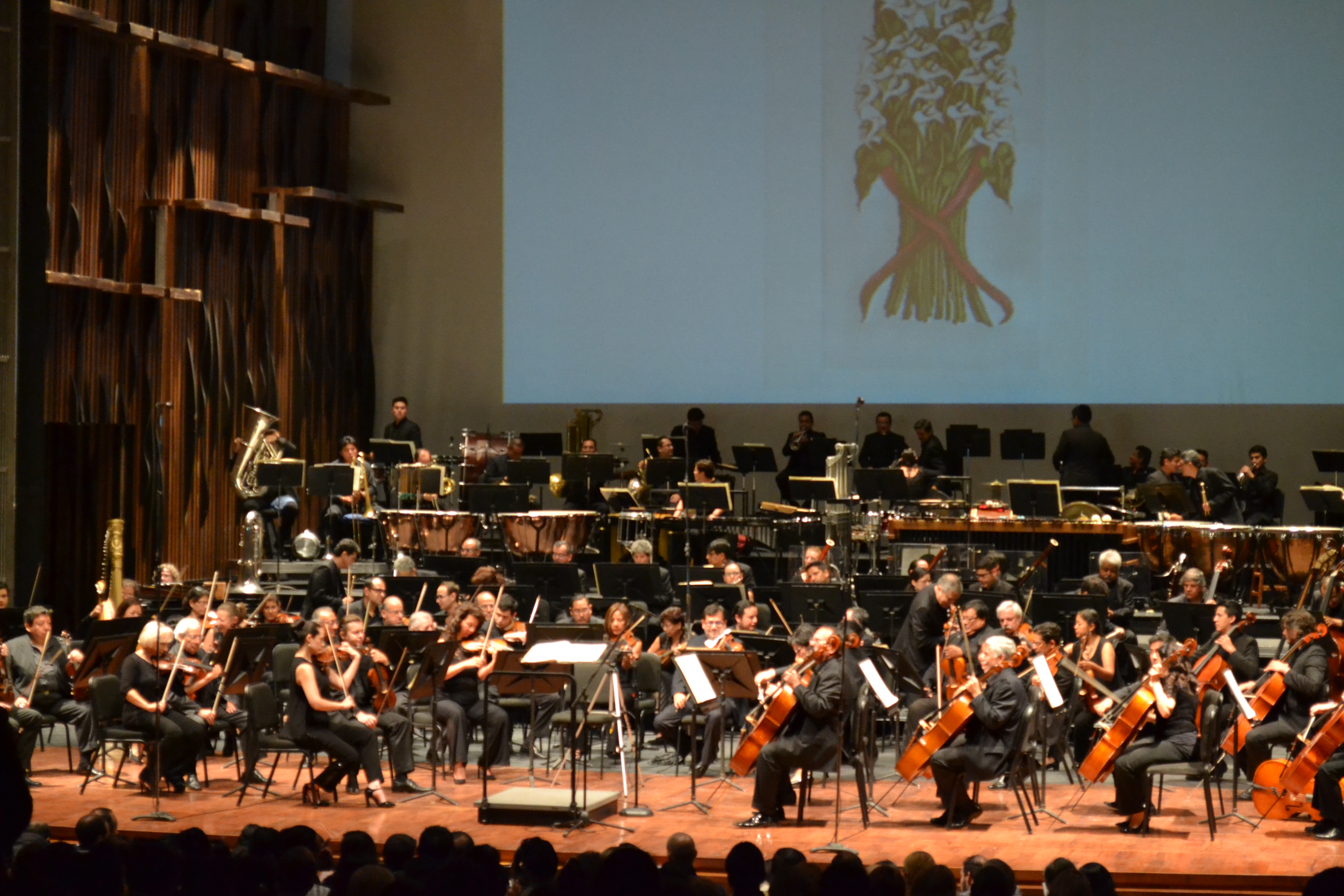
Mexican National Symphony Orchestra at Palacio de Bellas Artes.

In 1928, the Mexican Symphony Orchestra was created, but the name changed shortly to Symphony Orchestra of Mexico (Orquesta Sinfónica de México) . This orchestra is more related to the current orchestra. Carlos Chávez was appointed as its first conductor, but it lacked of any financial support, besides that the orchestra wasn't being well administrated by the city's musician syndicate of that time. While Chávez conducted the orchestra, it meaning a flourishing period for the orchestral music in the country.

A private patronage was established and the orchestra could give its first concert. The date was September 2, 1928, and the place, the Iris Theatre. With 103 musicians on stage, the program included Debussy's Ibéria Suite, Tello's Sonata Tragica, Tchaikovsky´s Piano Concerto No. 1 in B-flat minor with Vilma Erenyi as soloist, and Strauss's Don Juan. Although the orchestra received financial support from the government, this was considered as a private one, not official, like it is constituted today. This is the most important point to consider the nature of this musical organization at the present time.

Mexican composer Silvestre Revueltas, who was second in charge as assistant conductor, left the orchestra in 1935 to be the principal conductor of a newly created and short-lived National Symphony Orchestra that depended from the National Music Conservatory, but it closed in 1937 when Revueltas resigned.

=== Creation of the INBA and establishment of the current orchestra ===
On November 23, 1946, president Miguel Alemán proposed the creation of the National Institute of Fine Arts and Literature (Instituto Nacional de Bellas Artes y Literatura), known by the acronym INBA, and was formally opened on 1 January 1947, as a branch of the Secretaría de Educación Pública, (SEP) (Secretariat of Public Education). The first head of the INBA was Carlos Chávez, who created a new orchestra for the Conservatory (thus because the conservatory depended on the INBA administration). On January 19, 1949, Chávez resigned his job as conductor of the Symphony Orchestra of Mexico, to spend more of his time composing and directing the INBA, but the orchestra didn't disappear, because Chávez succeeded in making the government recognize a national ensemble (working on this issue, since he was appointed as head of the INBA), so the actual organization known as National Symphony Orchestra of México was established, and Eduardo Hernández Moncada was designated its first conductor in 1947, José Pablo Moncayo replaced him in 1949.

=== The orchestra from its creation to the present day ===
Moncayo was succeeded in 1954 by Luis Herrera de la Fuente, who led the orchestra until 1972. During this period the orchestra had very important tours nationwide and worldwide, especially in Europe. In 1973 Chávez returned to conduct the orchestra but resigned in the first month due to internal conflicts with the orchestra members. This resulted in the formation of a new artistic administration by some of the musicians and representatives from the INBA called co-government. Under this arrangement there was no principal conductor; instead, the orchestra had host conductors for its seasons and a Mexican assistant director for off-season affairs.

After several years of this arrangement, the orchestra accepted to have a conductor again in 1979, appointing Sergio Cárdenas, who served until 1984. After him served Jose Guadalupe Flores from 1985 to 1986, followed by Francisco Savín from 1986 to 1988, and from 1989 to 1990 Luis Herrera de la Fuente returned. Participation in national festivals, music workshops, conferences, band concerts and chamber-music concerts were offered by the orchestra during these years.

In May 1990, Enrique Arturo Diemecke was appointed as new conductor. He revived the tradition of touring promoted by Herrera de la Fuente during his first term, traveling to festivals in Portugal and Spain in 1992 and touring within Mexico and United States in 1999 and 2002. During his direction, the orchestra encouraged soundtrack concerts that consisted of playing music from films like the Mexican "Redes", music by Aaron Copland or West Side Story from Leonard Bernstein and several others. Didactic concerts for kids, concerts with worldwide renowned soloists like Jorge Federico Osorio, Frederica von Stade and violin virtuoso Itzhak Perlman were held by the orchestra in these years, and in 2002 the orchestra was nominated for Latin Grammy award for Best Classical Album. In 2003 the orchestra celebrated its 75th anniversary with a concert in Mexico's National Auditorium performing the Ludwig van Beethoven´s Symphony No. 9 (Choral), Op. 125 with an almost sold out locations. In November 2006, after 16 years of continuous works, Diemecke left the orchestra.

Carlos Miguel Prieto, was named at the end of 2007 principal conductor. In early 2008 he led it on its first European tour in years, culminating with an acclaimed concert at Amsterdam's renowned Concertgebouw Hall. Also in 2008 the orchestra celebrated its 80th anniversary. Prieto left the orchestra in 2022.

Ludwig Carrasco was appointed principal conductor of the orchestra in November 2022.

== Directors ==
- Eduardo Hernández Moncada (1947-1949)
- José Pablo Moncayo (1949-1954)
- Luis Herrera de la Fuente (1954-1972)
- Carlos Chávez (1973)
- Sergio Cárdenas (1979-1984)
- José Guadalupe Flores (1985-1986)
- Francisco Savín (1986-1988)
- Luis Herrera de la Fuente (1989-1990)
- Enrique Diemecke (1990-2007)
- Carlos Miguel Prieto (2007-2022)
- Ludwig Carrasco (2023-presente)

== Discography ==
- 1993 – Moncayo, Revueltas, Chávez recorded at the Sala Nezahualcóyotl (Nezahualcóyotl Concert Hall).
- 2002 – Los Conciertos para violín y piano de Carlos Chávez live at the Palacio de Bellas Artes (Nominated for Latin Grammy).
- 2004 – Sonidos de un espacio en Libertad.
