= Daniel Castañeda Soriano =

Mexican musicologist

Daniel Castañeda Soriano was a Mexican musicologist, composer and engineer.

Soriano was Chief of the Academia de Música Mexicana at the National Conservatory of Music of Mexico in the 1930s. His main interest was focused on Mexican folklore. With the collaboration of Vicente T. Mendoza, he compiled a treatise of Pre-Columbian era instruments, published in 1937 under the name Instrumental Precortesiano.
