= Danzón No. 2 =

Composition by Arturo Márquez

Danzón No.2
- Contemporary Classical by Arturo Márquez
- Year: 1994
- Form: Symphonic Orchestra
- Commissioned by: Department of Musical Activities, National Autonomous University of Mexico
- Time: 4/4 with measures in 6/8 and 7/8
- Dedication: Lily Márquez
- Duration: 9:37

Premiere
- Date: March 1994: Mexico City
- Location: Mexico City
- Conductor: Francisco Savín
- Performers: Orchestra Filarmonica de la UNAM (National Autonomous University of Mexico)

Danzón No. 2 is a composition for full orchestra by the Mexican composer Arturo Márquez. It was commissioned by the National Autonomous University of Mexico's Department of Musical Activities and was premiered in 1994 in Mexico City by the Orchestra Filarmonica de la UNAM under the direction of Francisco Savín.

Danzón No. 2 is one of the most popular and most frequently performed Mexican contemporary classical orchestral compositions. It is celebrated as a symbol of Mexican music and culture.

Danzón No. 2 gained great popularity worldwide when the Simón Bolívar Youth Orchestra of Venezuela under Gustavo Dudamel included it on their programme for their 2007 European and American tour.

== Instrumentation ==
Danzón No. 2 is originally scored for a full orchestra that consists of the following:

- 2 flutes (and piccolo)
- 2 oboes
- 2 clarinets
- 2 bassoons
- 4 horns
- 2 trumpets
- 3 trombones
- tuba
- timpani
- percussion (bass drum, claves, güiro, snare drum, suspended cymbal, 3 tom-toms)
- piano
- strings

== Structure ==
The rhythmic interest in the piece is maintained through the use of varying accents and tempo. This staple of the contemporary Mexican music literature expresses and reflects on the dance style named danzón, which has its origins in Cuba but is a very important part of the folklore of the Mexican state of Veracruz. The music was inspired by a visit to a ballroom in Veracruz. The piece features solos for clarinet, oboe, piano, violin, double bass, French horn, trumpet, flute, and piccolo.

== In popular culture ==
A short film of the same name was made in 2009 by Mexican filmmaker Guillermo Ortiz Pichardo, using the piece as the main narrative device, in a Fantasia-like manner. It is set in Mexico City in the 1940s, the golden age of danzón, and the style is an homage to the Mexican cinema of the period. The film features Arturo Márquez in a cameo as the pianist of the dance-hall. It was premiered at the 8th Morelia International Film Festival as part of its official lineup.

The piece is included in the Amazon Video streaming service series Mozart in the Jungle in season two, episode six. A youth orchestra in Mexico City plays it under the direction of Rodrigo De Souza (a character based on Gustavo Dudamel), a talented young conductor and former member of the youth orchestra.
