= José Pablo Moncayo =

Mexican musician, music teacher, composer and conductor

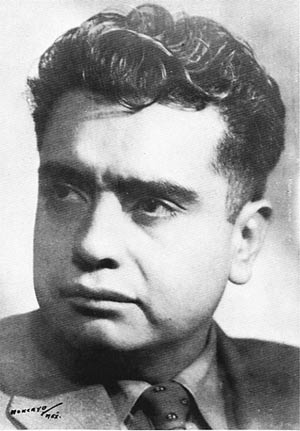
Jose Pablo Moncayo

José Pablo Moncayo García (June 29, 1912 – June 16, 1958) was a Mexican pianist, percussionist, music teacher, composer and conductor. "As composer, José Pablo Moncayo represents one of the most important legacies of the Mexican nationalism in art music, after Silvestre Revueltas and Carlos Chávez." He produced some of the masterworks that best symbolize the essence of the national aspirations and contradictions of Mexico in the 20th century.

== Biography ==
Born in Guadalajara, Jalisco, José Pablo Moncayo was introduced to music by his elder brother Francisco. Eduardo Hernández Moncada is reported as the first teacher of José Pablo Moncayo in 1926, when the teenager was fourteen years old. According to Aurelio Tello, Hernández Moncada suggested his pupil Moncayo study at the National Conservatory. Tello reports that Moncayo was admitted to the conservatory in 1929; meanwhile, in order to finance his studies, he worked as a jazz pianist. According to the research of Torres-Chibrás, Moncayo took composition lessons with Candelario Huízar, and continued his piano instruction with Hernández Moncada. It is not certain in which courses Moncayo registered at the conservatory and who his other teachers were, but thanks to the biographies of his contemporaries Salvador Contreras, Blas Galindo and Daniel Ayala we may assume that Moncayo followed a similar path during his instruction at the National Conservatory. Huízar taught courses such as harmony, counterpoint and analysis (also called musical forms). Solfège or sight reading was taught by the eminent professors Vicente T. Mendoza and Gerónimo Baqueiro Foster. Music history was taught by Ernesto Enríquez. Luis Sandi was the conductor of the conservatory chorale and Eduardo Hernández Moncada, the associate conductor. In different periods Hernández Moncada taught, in addition to his piano lessons, harmony, sight reading, and later, opera ensembles. José Rolón, who had studied under Nadia Boulanger and Paul Dukas in Paris (and also met Arnold Schoenberg), taught harmony, counterpoint and fugue. Chávez was highly concerned with the general education and culture of the conservatory students and established literature courses taught by the contemporary poets Salvador Novo and Carlos Pellicer, world history by Jesús C. Romero, and history of Mexican culture by Agustín Loera and Chávez himself.

According to Salvador Contreras, Carlos Chávez created a composition course at the National Conservatory. Although Roberto García Morillo points out the year 1930, most sources agreed that this course started in 1931. According to Robert L. Parker, this new composition class was originally called Class of Musical Creation and later, Composition Workshop; Chávez had some colleagues as pupils, such as Vicente T. Mendoza, Candelario Huízar and Revueltas, and "there were four students under twenty years of age: Daniel Ayala and Blas Galindo (both pure blooded Indians), Salvador Contreras and José Pablo Moncayo." Jesús C. Romero suggests that Chávez conducted a selection process among young students of the conservatory before admitting anyone and relates that Daniel Ayala was chosen thanks to his "incipient renown as composer, Salvador Contreras, for his violin skills, and José Pablo Moncayo, on account of his ability to do sight reading at the piano." Furthermore, Romero reports that Blas Galindo was admitted the following year together with five other students. It seems that the new composition course attracted many students, their number increasing year after year, but only four of them attended the final examination. These four diligent students were Moncayo, Contreras, Galindo and Ayala. An article written by Galindo confirms his admittance to the course in 1932, together with seven other students. The article offers a detailed account of the training received at Chávez's workshop.

At the first performance of the Renovation Musical Society (Sociedad Musical "Renovación") on August 22, 1931, Moncayo presents a couple of his own compositions, Impressions in a Forest, and Impression, both for solo piano. An opportunity of professional advancement for Moncayo in 1932 was his admission to the Symphony Orchestra of Mexico (OSM). The first program of the season of the Symphony Orchestra of Mexico dated 28 October 1932, lists the name of José Pablo Moncayo for the first time as a member of the orchestra's percussion section.

During the fall of 1932, Chávez organized a festival of chamber music at the National Conservatory and invited his friend Aaron Copland to participate in it. The friendship between Chávez and Copland was extended to Revueltas as well, as described by Eduardo Contreras Soto, revealing that Revueltas also exchanged correspondence with the American composer. Moncayo and Galindo, both incipient proteges of Chávez, also started a long and fruitful relationship with Copland. Next year, Moncayo got a part-time job as music teacher in a school (16 May 1933).

Mexican newspapers reported that on 1 December 1934, the new president of Mexico, General Lázaro Cárdenas, took the oath of office. There was a change in executive positions in the federal government, and Ignacio García Téllez, former dean of the National University, was now appointed Secretary of Education. García Téllez appointed José Muñoz Cota as chief of the Department of Fine Arts; as a result Chávez was removed from the head of the National Conservatory and was replaced by his enemy Estanislao Mejía. According to Blas Galindo, with the arrival of this new administration the composition workshop was terminated. Consequently, the composition training of Moncayo and his young friends was interrupted. According to Torres-Chibrás, "life was not easy at the conservatory for the four "orphans" of Maestro Chávez. Despite all the pressure exerted against them, they overcame all the difficulties, joined forces and emerged as an avant-garde group." Blas Galindo reports that they were branded as "Chavistas" and blacklisted by the new administration of the Conservatory, to the point of setting obstacles for their registration. They decided to give a first concert with their compositions demonstrating with it the truthfulness of the class of Music Creation that had been suppressed from the study plan of the Conservatory. The four friends agreed to arrange the program with compositions made by them after Chávez's departure from the conservatory. On 25 November 1935, at 8:30 P.M., the first concert of these young composers took place at the Teatro de Orientación. Moncayo premièred his Sonatina for solo piano, performed by himself, and premiered as well Amatzinac, for flute and string quartet. His friends collaborated as performers in the following order: Salvador Contreras and Daniel Ayala, violins; Miguel Bautista, viola; Juan Manuel Téllez Oropeza, violoncello; and Miguel Preciado, as flute soloist. A review from José Barros Serra calls the students "The Group of Four," with the aim to promote the nationalistic spirit of Mexican music. The second time these four young composers joined as a group was in a concert that took place on 26 March 1936, at 8:30 P.M. at the Teatro de Orientación. They adopted the epithet given to them the previous year in a newspaper review by José Barros Serra, the "Group of Four," and this was the first public appearance where they intentionally used it. The Group of Four experienced increasing awareness among Mexican audiences and even some internationalization.

In the collection of programs of the year 1936 at library of the National Arts Center, in Mexico City, José Pablo Moncayo is listed as a member of the percussion section of the controversial National Symphony Orchestra created in 1935 at the National Conservatory by Estanislao Mejía and conducted by Silvestre Revueltas from 1936 on. The OSM programs preserved at the Library of the National Center of the Arts have the program of 5 September 1936, where Moncayo's La Adelita was premiered by the Orquesta Sinfónica de México, within the children's concert series, under Carlos Chávez's baton. One week later, on 11 September, Moncayo made his debut as orchestra conductor with the OSM, at the age of 24. During the seventh program of the season, Chávez gave Moncayo the opportunity to conduct the opening work of the evening, the Prelude of Richard Wagner's Lohengrin. Chávez conducted the rest of the program that included La Damoiselle élue by Debussy, and Beethoven's Ninth Symphony. The same month, in another program of the children's concert series, the one of 26 September 1936, another arrangement by Moncayo, La Valentina, was premiered by the OSM, conducted by Carlos Chávez.

In 1941 Chávez organized a concert of Mexican music with the OSM that included some of the works presented the previous year in New York and requested Moncayo and Contreras to write compositions for such program. José Antonio Alcaraz says that, "It was Chávez himself who asked Moncayo to write a piece based on popular music of the (Mexican) southeast coast for a concert that he called 'Traditional Mexican Music.' "

According to the notes prepared by Herbert Weinstock for the concerts arranged by Chávez in New York (1940), the program then included a work called Huapangos by Gerónimo Baqueiro Foster. This piece was an orchestral arrangement of several popular dances from the eastern state of Veracruz. In the 1941 program Chávez replaced Baqueiro's Huapangos with a new work called Huapango, written by Moncayo (a huapango is a type of Mexican dance). The difference is that Moncayo's Huapango is not just an arrangement but a legitimate work inspired by the popular music of Veracruz ("El Siquisiri", "El Balajú" and "El Gavilancito"). Chávez sent Moncayo and Galindo to Veracruz for a field exploration about the popular music of the region. Quoted by Moncayo's faithful pupil, José Antonio Alcaraz, Moncayo reports his experience:

Blas Galindo and I went to Alvarado, one of the places where folkloric music is preserved in its most pure form; we were collecting melodies, rhythms and instrumentations over several days. The transcription of it was very difficult because the huapangueros (musicians) never sang the same melody twice in the same way. When I came back to Mexico, I showed the collected material to Candelario Huízar; Huízar gave me a piece of advice that I will always be grateful for: "Present the material first in the same way you heard it and develop it later according to your own thought." And I did it, and the result is almost satisfactory for me.

Moncayo's Huapango was premièred on 15 August 1941, at the Palacio de Bellas Artes by the Symphony Orchestra of Mexico under Chávez's baton. Programs of the 1942 season list Eduardo Hernández Moncada as assistant conductor and José Pablo Moncayo at the piano as well as in the percussion section. Moncayo began to work on an ambitious project, a symphony. That summer, and probably thanks to the recommendations of Chávez and Copland, Moncayo and Galindo were granted scholarships from the Rockefeller Foundation to study at the Berkshire Music Institute, known today as the Tanglewood Music Center. According to Dr. Jesús C. Romero, Moncayo was invited to attend there by Aaron Copland and Serge Koussevitzky. The Symphony was scheduled to be premiered by the Orquesta Sinfónica de México on 21 August 1942, but the performance was postponed. The première would take place a couple of years later. The program notes of 1 September 1944, written by Francisco Agea, explain that the two last movements were written in Massachusetts:

Both movements were written in the United States, when Moncayo, invited by the director Serge Koussevitzky, attended the Tanglewood Music Center and the special courses taught to the new generations of composers. It is evident that the author, finding himself abroad and longing for his fatherland, felt the need to express himself in a Mexican language.

Moncayo worked at Tanglewood not only on his symphony but also completed another work, probably in Copland's composition course, Llano Grande for chamber orchestra, which was premiered by the orchestra during the Berkshire Festival precisely on 21 August. Arroyos by Blas Galindo, Moncayo's alter ego in this trip, was premiered at Tanglewood a few days before, on 17 August. The two Mexicans also had the opportunity to meet two other fellow composers and conductors who attended the courses at Tanglewood that summer, Lukas Foss and twenty-four-year-old Leonard Bernstein. Galindo reports his experiences about Tanglewood:

There I meet Bernstein, who was kilometers ahead of me, Lukas Foss . . . I remember Hindemith who was very serious. I also met Latin-American composers like Ginastera . . . [about Varèse] I have photos and autographed scores of his. I liked to go visit his studio in New York [City]; his compositions amazed me. He was building his techniques out of noises. I admire him because he dared to break with traditions, he was a pioneer. He knew that I cared about him.

The programs of 1945 reveal that Moncayo was appointed assistant conductor of the Symphony Orchestra of Mexico in that year and that his activities as conductor increased. The year 1946, the rising conducting career of Moncayo brought him to his next position. Chávez appointed the thirty-four-year-old conductor as artistic director of the Symphony Orchestra of Mexico, while Chávez remained its musical director.

Since it was not my intention to interrupt my achievement (the OSM), but that it continue under the responsibility of the Board of the Symphony and the competent and able technicians that they would recruit, I had no other choice but to remain as director of the orchestra, with the greatest and best desire that the new artistic director that we selected to formally work beside me, José Pablo Moncayo, would arrive to take full responsibility of the situation.

However, the Symphony Orchestra of Mexico season program of 1948 (13 February to 25 April) no longer lists Moncayo as a member of the orchestra. In 1948 Eduardo Hernández Moncada was the conductor of the National Symphony Orchestra (Mexico) (OSN)—created in 1947 under the aegis of the National Institute of Fine Arts—and within the programs Moncayo's name appears on the list of musicians as the orchestra pianist. Chávez, as general director of the Fine Arts Institute, appointed Moncayo as music director/conductor of the National Symphony Orchestra (Mexico) on 1 January 1949.

The last program found with Moncayo's name as conductor of the OSN dates from Wednesday 17 February 1954. It was a memorial concert held at the Palace of Fine Arts to honor a distinguished music professor, Don Luis Moctezuma, recently deceased. The program consisted of some words of appraisal by Andrés Iduarte, General Director of the INBA, Three Pieces for Orchestra by Moncayo, the Concerto for Three Pianos and Orchestra by J. S. Bach, an address by professor Manuel Bermejo Chibrás, followed by Piano Concerto No. 2 by Rachmaninoff. This was the last time in his life Moncayo conducted the National Symphony Orchestra of Mexico. His name never again appeared on a program of the OSN.

On 16 June 1958, Moncayo died in his home, at 295 Amsterdam Avenue, Mexico City, only a few days before his forty-sixth birthday.

== Musical legacy ==
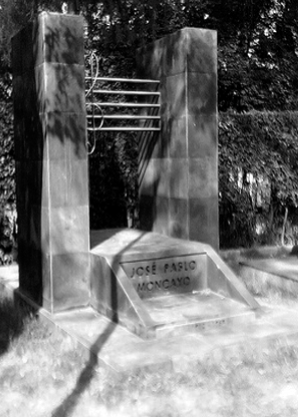
Grave in the Rotunda of Illustrious People of Mexico City.

José Pablo Moncayo is best known as the composer of Huapango, a bright, short orchestral arrangement of popular dances from the eastern state of Veracruz, that is sometimes included in concerts by American orchestras. Scholarly research about this composer in the United States is today still scarce. Despite being highly regarded in his own country, Moncayo has been the subject of scant academic research, restricted to some program notes; magazine, newspaper and journal articles; and short paragraphs in music dictionaries and encyclopedias. Although the major contribution of Moncayo to Mexican music has been in the field of composition, he also played a relevant role in the national stage of culture during the ten years of his conducting career (1944–1954). As orchestra conductor, his promising career was hampered by a difficult cultural environment, political situations and premature death. According to Torres-Chibrás, José Pablo Moncayo's career as an orchestra conductor is a subject that has not been exhausted by Mexican or foreign scholars. José Antonio Alcaraz, musicologist and leading music critic of Mexico, assesses that:

Mexican nationalism vigorously encompasses a period whose chronological limits may be fixed for study purposes with some precision in 1928: the year of the founding of the Symphony Orchestra of Mexico and ending three decades later, in 1958 with the death of José Pablo Moncayo, a composer born in 1912.

Moncayo's death coincides with the decline of the Nationalist movement resulting from the demise of the ideals of the Mexican Revolution. Yolanda Moreno Rivas concludes:

The death of Moncayo in 1958 tangibly marked the end of the Mexican nationalist composition school. In the same way that his work without followers surpassed and abolished the innocent use of the Mexicanism theme, his death closed the predominance of a composition style whose imprint marked musical creation in Mexico during more than three decades; although only at the beginning of the sixties would it be possible to talk about the definitive abandonment of the great Mexican fresco, the oblivion of the epic tone, and the search for new structural factors in composition.

Moncayo's best-known work continues to be his colorful orchestral fantasy Huapango (1941), but his production also includes many other pieces of a high quality, notwithstanding their lesser fame. Among these are works like Amatzinac for flute and string quartet (1935); his Symphony (1944); Sinfonietta (1945); Homenaje a Cervantes for two oboes and string orchestra (1947); his opera La Mulata de Córdoba (1948); Tierra de Temporal (1949); Muros Verdes for piano solo (1951); Bosques (1954); and the ballet Tierra (1956).

== Chronological catalog of compositions ==
Undated	Fantasía intocable for solo piano Romanza de las flores de calabaza for solo piano Canción india for orchestra Ofrenda for orchestra Sobre las olas que van for voice and piano Memento musical for chorus	
1931	Impresiones de un bosque for solo piano. Impresión for solo piano.	Première, August 22, Conciertos Renovación. Private concert at Professor Gerónimo Baqueiro Foster's home at Moneda 10, downtown Mexico City.
	Diálogo para dos pianos y una vaca for two pianos.	
1933	Sonata for violoncello and piano	
1934	Sonata for violin and violoncello	
	Sonata for viola and piano.	Mexico City: Ediciones Mexicanas de Música, 1991.
1935	Sonatina for solo piano.	Première, November 25, Teatro de Orientación. First concert of the Group of Four.
	Amatzinac for flute and string quartet.	Première, November 25, Teatro de Orientación. Salvador Contreras and Daniel Ayala, violins; Miguel Bautista, viola; Juan Manuel Téllez Oropeza, violoncello; Manuel Preciado, flute soloist. First Concert of the Group of Four. Mexico City: Ediciones Mexicanas de Música, 1987.
1936	Pequeño nocturno for string quartet and piano	
	La Adelita arranged for orchestra.	Première, September 5, Orquesta Sinfónica de México, children's concert series, Carlos Chávez, conductor.
	La Valentina arranged for orchestra.	Première, September 26, Orquesta Sinfónica de México, children's concert series, Carlos Chávez, conductor.
	Romanza for violin, violoncello and piano.	Première, October 15, Palacio de Bellas Artes, Sala de Conferencias.
	Sonata for violin and piano.	Première, October 15, Palacio de Bellas Artes, Sala de Conferencias. Mexico City: Ediciones Mexicanas de Música, 1990.
1937	Tenabari arranged for orchestra.	Première, September 10, Orquesta Sinfónica de México, children's concert series, third concert, Carlos Chávez, conductor.
1938	Trío for flute, violin and piano.	Première, August 23, Palace of Fine Arts, Sala de Conferencias.
	Llano alegre for orchestra	
	Hueyapan for orchestra.	Première, 21 November 1940, Orquesta Sinfónica de Repertorio, Palacio de Bellas Artes, José Pablo Moncayo, conductor. Last concert of the Group of Four.
1941	Huapango for orchestra.	Première, 15 August Orquesta Sinfónica de México, Carlos Chávez, conductor. Mexico City: Ediciones Mexicanas de Música, 1950.
1942	Symphony, for orchestra.	Completed in Berkshire. Programmed to be premiered by the Orquesta Sinfónica de México on August 21, but postponed.
	Llano grande for chamber orchestra.	Premiere, 17 August, Berkshire Music Center, Boston Symphony.
1944	Symphony, for orchestra.	Premiere, 1 September, Orquesta Sinfónica de México, Carlos Chávez, conductor.
1945	Sinfonietta for orchestra.	Completed, 3 July. Premiere, 13 July, Orquesta Sinfónica de México, José Pablo Moncayo, conductor. Mexico City: Ediciones Mexicanas de Música, 1993.
1947	Tres piezas para orquesta: Feria, Canción y Danza.	Completed, 9 July. Premiere, 18 July, Orquesta Sinfónica de México, José Pablo Moncayo, conductor.
	Homenaje a Cervantes, for two oboes and string orchestra.	Completed, 18 October. Premiere, 27 October, Palacio de Bellas Artes, Orquesta Sinfónica del Conservatorio Nacional de Música, Luis Sandi, conductor. Mexico City: Ediciones Mexicanas de Música, 1989.
	Canción del mar, for a cappella chorus (SATB).	Première, 14 June, Palacio de Bellas Artes, Sala de Conferencias, Coro de Madrigalistas, Luis Sandi, conductor. Mexico City: Ediciones Mexicanas de Música, 1983.
1948	Homenaje a Carlos Chávez, for solo piano. Completed, 18 June.	
	Conde Olinos, for chorus and piano.	Composed as part of Moncayo's commission as member of the repertory committee for school music of the INBA.
	Tres piezas, for piano.	Première, 14 December, Palacio de Bellas Artes, Sala Ponce, Alicia Urrueta, soloist. Mexico City: Ediciones Mexicanas de Música, 1948.
	La mulata de Córdoba, opera in one act.	Completed, 29 September. Première, 23 October, Palacio de Bellas Artes, Orquesta Sinfónica de Xalapa, José Pablo Moncayo, conductor. Mexico City: Ediciones Mexicanas de Música, 1979. Reduction for five solo voices, chorus and piano.
1949	Pieza, for solo piano	
	Tierra de temporal, for orchestra.	Completed, September 1949. Première, June 1950, Orquesta Sinfónica Nacional, José Pablo Moncayo, conductor. Private performance at the National Conservatory. Mexico City: Universidad Nacional Autónoma de México, 1984.
1951	Muros verdes, for solo piano.	Mexico City: Ediciones Mexicanas de Música, 1964.
1940–1953	Cumbres, for orchestra.	Started in 1940. Completed, 20 November 1953. Commissioned by the Louisville Symphony. Première, 1954, Louisville Symphony, Robert Whitney, conductor. Mexico City: Ediciones Mexicanas de Música, 1993.
1954	Bosques, for orchestra.	Completed June 1954. Première 1957, Orquesta Sinfónica de Guadalajara, Blas Galindo, conductor. Mexico City: Universidad Nacional Autónoma de México, 1988.
	La potranca, music for an episode of the film Raíces.	Produced by Manuel Barbachano and directed by Benito Alazraki.
1956	Tierra, ballet.	Completed 12 November 1956. Premiere September 1958, Orquesta del Teatro de Bellas Artes.
1957	Simiente, for solo piano	
1958	Pequeño nocturno, for solo piano	

== Selected sources consulted ==
- Agea, Francisco (ed). 1949. 21 Años de la Orquesta Sinfónica de México (Twenty One Years of the Mexican Symphony Orchestra). Mexico City: La Imprenta del Nuevo Mundo.
- Agea, Francisco. 1941. "Huapango". Notes to the Season Program. Mexico City: Orquesta Sinfónica de México.
- Agea, Francisco. 1943. "Huapango". Notes to the Season Program. Mexico City: Orquesta Sinfónica de México.
- Agea, Francisco. 1944. El Concurso de composiciones mexicanas (The Mexican Compositions Contest). Notes to the Season Program. México City: Orquesta Sinfónica de México, 1944.
- Agea, Francisco. 1945. "Sinfonietta". Notes to the Season Program. México City: Orquesta Sinfónica de México, 1945.
- Agea, Francisco. 1947. "Tres piezas para orquesta" (Three Pieces for Orchestra). Notes to the Performance Program No. 5. Mexico City: Orquesta Sinfónica de México.
- Alcaraz, José Antonio. 1975. La obra de José Pablo Moncayo. Cuadernos de música, nueva serie 2. México: UNAM/Difusión Cultural, Departamento de Música.
- Alcaraz, José Antonio. 1980. Tierra de Temporal/Moncayo. Notes to the cover record. Peerless/Forlane MS7010-3 (1980). 33 1/3 record.
- Alcaraz, José Antonio. 1991. Reflexiones sobre el nacionalismo musical mexicano (Thoughts about the Mexican Musical Nationalism). Mexico City: Editorial Patria.
- Alcaraz, José Antonio. 1998a. En la más honda música de selva(In the Deepest Music of Jungle). Mexico City: Consejo Nacional para la Cultura y las Artes, 1998.
- Alcaraz, José Antonio. 1998b. Interview by Armando Torres Chibrás, 24 July, Mexico. Videocassette 8mm NTSC. Armando Torres Chibrás's dissertation archives, Mexico City.
- Alcaraz, José Antonio. 1998c. "Moncayo: Un libro del FIC para niños" (Moncayo: A Festival Internacional Cervantino's book for Children). Proceso, 13 September, 62.
- Alvarez Coral, Juan. 1993. Compositores mexicanos (Mexican Composers). Mexico City: Edamex, 1993.
- Anonymous. 1935. "Concierto de un grupo de cuatro jóvenes compositores" (Concert of a group of Four Young Composers). Performance Program. Teatro de Orientación, Mexico City (25 November).
- Anonymous. 1936a. "Concierto del Grupo de los Cuatro" (Performance of the Group of Four). Performance Program. Sala de Conferencias de Palacio de Bellas Artes, Mexico City (31 March).
- Anonymous. 1936b. "Concierto del Grupo de los Cuatro dedicado a las escuelas de arte para los trabajadores" (Performance of the Group of Four dedicated to the Arts Schools for the Workers). Performance Program. Mexico City (17 June).
- Anonymous. 1936c. "Concierto del Grupo de los Cuatro" (Performance of the Group of Four). Performance Program. Sala de Conferencias de Palacio de Bellas Artes, Mexico City (15 October).
- Anonymous. 1936d. "Conciertos de la Sociedad Musical Renovación" (Concerts of the Renovation Musical Society). Performance program, Mexico City (22 August).
- Anonymous. 1947a. "Conciertos de los lunes: Programa a cargo de J.P. Moncayo"(Monday Concerts: Programa in Charge of J.P. Moncayo). Nuestra Música 8 (Año 2, October): 210.
- Anonymous. 1947b. "La Orquesta Sinfónica de México: Vigésima temporada" (The Symphony Orchestra of Mexico: Twentieth Season). Nuestra Música 7 (Año 2, July): 164-168.
- Anonymous. 1947c. "La Orquesta Sinfónica de México en su XX temporada" (The Symphony Orchestra of Mexico in its Twentieth Season). Nuestra Música 8 (Año 2, October): 220-223.
- Aretz, Isabel (ed.) 1984. América Latina en su música (Latin-America in its music). 4th ed. Mexico City: Siglo Veintiuno Editores/UNESCO.
- Barce, Ramón. 1992. "José Pablo Moncayo." Ritmo, no. 631 (April): 44–45.
- Bal y Gay, Jesús, Carlos Chávez, Blas Galindo, Rodolfo Halfter, José Pablo Moncayo, Adolfo Salazar and Luis Sandi. 1946. "Actividades del grupo: Conciertos de los lunes" (Activities of the Group: Monday Concerts). Nuestra Música 1 (Año 1): 37-38.
- Baqueiro Foster, Gerónimo. 1961. "Biografías de músicos mexicanos: José Pablo Moncayo" (Biographies of Mexican Musicians: José Pablo Moncayo). Carnet Musical 14-197:328-30.
- Baqueiro Foster, Gerónimo. 1964. Historia de la música en México (History of Music in Mexico). Mexico City: Departamento de Música/INBA/SEP.
- Barros Serra, José. 1935. "Grupo de los Cuatro: Crítica musical" (Group of Four: Music Review). El Universal (27 November).
- Behague, Gerard. 1979. Music in Latin America: An Introduction. Englewood Cliffs, N.J.: Prentice-Hall, 1979.
- Carmona, Gloria. 1989. Epistolario selecto de Carlos Chávez (Selected Epistolary of Carlos Chávez). Mexico City: Fondo de Cultura Económica.
- Carredano, Consuelo. 1994. Ediciones Mexicanas de Música: Historia y catálogo (Mexican editions of Music: History and Catalogue). Mexico City: Centro Nacional de Investigación, Documentación e Información Musical "Carlos Chávez".
- Contreras Soto, Eduardo. 1988. "Alrededor del huapango: Notas sueltas sobre una obra conocida" (Around the Huapango: Loose Notes About a Known Work). Heterofonía 20, no.98–99:16–27.
- Contreras Soto, Eduardo. 1993. Eduardo Hernández Moncada: Ensayo biográfico, catálogo de obras y antología de textos (Eduardo Hérnandez Moncada: Biographical Essay, Works Catalog and Text Anthology). Mexico City: Centro Nacional de Investigación, Documentación e Información Musical "Carlos Chávez."
- Contreras Soto, Eduardo. 2000. Silvestre Revueltas: Baile, duelo y son. [México]: Consejo Nacional para la Cultura y las Artes, Dirección General de Publicaciones, Instituto Nacional de Bellas Artes. ISBN 970-18-3762-2
- Copland, Aaron. 1968. "Composers from Mexico." In Copland, The New Music: 1900–1960, revised and enlarged edition, New York: W. W. Norton..
- Dahlhaus, Carl (ed.). 1975. Riemann Musik Lexikon: Ergänzungsband, Personenteil L–Z (Riemann's Music Lexicon: Supplement, People L–Z). Mainz and New York: B. Schott's Söhne.
- Daniels, David. 1996. Orchestral Music: A Handbook, second edition. Lanham, Md. & London: The Scarecrow Press.
- Domingo, Placido. 1985. Mis primeros cuarenta años (My First Forty Years). México City: Editorial Planeta.
- Eisenberg, Abel. 1990. Entre violas y violines: Crónica crítica de un músico mexicano (Among Violas and Violines: Critical Chronicle by a Mexican Musician). Mexico City: Edamex.
- Galindo Dimas, Blas. 1948. "Compositores de mi generación"(Composers from my Generation). Nuestra música 3, no. 10 (April):73-81. Reprinted in Pauta: Cuadernos de teoría y crítica musical 9, no. 35 (July–September 1990): 52-57.
- Ficher, Miguel, Martha Furman Schleifer, and John M. Furman. 1996. Latin American Classical Composers: A Biographical Dictionary. Lanham, Md.: Scarecrow Press. ISBN 978-0-8108-3185-8
- García Morillo, Roberto. 1960. Carlos Chávez: Vida y obra (Carlos Chávez: Life and Work). Mexico City and Buenos Aires: Fondo de Cultura Económica.
- Herrera de la Fuente, Luis. 1998. La música no viaja sola (Music does not travel alone). Mexico City: Fondo de Cultura Económica.
- Kahan, Salomón. 1935. "Una hora experimental: Crónica del primer concierto del Grupo de los Cuatro" (An Experimental Hour: Review of the First Performance of the Group of Four). El Universal Gráfico (29 November).
- Miranda-Pérez, Ricardo. 1990. "Muros Verdes and the Creation of a New Musical Space." Latin American Music Review / Revista de Música Latinoamericana 11, No. 2 (Autumn): 281–85.
- Malström, Dan. 1974. "Introduction to Twentieth Century Mexican Music". Dissertation, Uppsala: Uppsala University, the Institute of Musicology. ISBN 91-7222-050-3. Spanish translation by Juan Jose Utrilla, as Introducción a la música mexicana del siglo XX. Mexico City: Fondo de Cultura Económica, 1977.
- Martinez, José Luis. Los caciques culturales (The Cultural Chieftains).Letras Libres 7 (July 1999): 28-29.
- Mayer-Serra, Otto. 1947. Música y músicos de Latinoamérica (Music and Musicians from Latin-America). Mexico City: Editorial Atlante.
- Mayer-Serra, Otto. 1941. Panorama de la música mexicana (Panorama of Mexican Music). Mexico City: Fondo de Cultura Económica/ El Colegio de México.
- Michaca, Pedro. 1931. El nacionalismo musical mexicano (The Mexican Nationalism in Music). Mexico City: Universidad Nacional Autónoma de México.
- Moncada García, Francisco. 1966. Pequeñas biografías de grandes músicos mexicanos (Small Biographies of Great Mexican Musicians). Mexico City: Ediciones Framong.
- Moreno Rivas, Yolanda. 1989. Rostros del nacionalismo en la música mexicana: Un Ensayo de Interpretación (Faces of the Mexican Nationalism: An Essay of Interpretation). Mexico City: Fondo de Cultura Económica.
- Moreno Rivas, Yolanda. La composición en México en el siglo XX (Composition in Mexico in the 20th century). Mexico City: Consejo Nacional Para la Cultura y Las Artes/ Cultura Contemporánea, 1994.
- Parker, Robert. 1983. Carlos Chávez, Mexico's Modern-day Orpheus. Boston, Mass.: Twayne Publishers. ISBN 0-8057-9455-7
- Parker, Robert L. 1987. "Copland and Chávez: Brothers-in-Arms". American Music 5, no. 4 (Winter): 433–44.
- Pulido, Esperanza. 1978a. "Los nuevos directores de orquesta: 1948" (The new orchestra conductors). Heterofonía 11, no. 5 (September–October): 4.
- Pulido, Esperanza. 1978b. "Las orquestas sinfónicas de México: 1948" (The Mexican Symphony Orchestras: 1948). Heterofonía 11, no. 5 (September–October): 5.
- Pulido, Esperanza. 1978c. "La Sinfónica Nacional: México en la cultura (18 de Mayo de 1958)" (The National Symphony: Mexico in the Culture [May 18, 1958]). Heterofonía 11, no. 5 (September–October): 8.
- Pulido, Esperanza. 1978d. "Veinte años después" (Twenty Years After). Heterofonía 11, no. 5 (September–October): 9.
- Ruiz Ortiz, Xochiquetzal.1994. Blas Galindo: Biografía, antología de textos y catálogo (Blas Galindo: Biography, Texts Anthology and Catalog). Mexico City: CENIDIM.
- Ruiz Ortiz, Xochiquetzal, and Roberto García Bonilla. 1992. "Rastros de un rostro o historias sin historias: Entrevista con Blas Galindo". Pauta: Cuadernos de teoría y crítica musical 11, no. 41 (January–March): 51-68.
- Slonimsky, Nicolas. 1945. Music of Latin America. New York: Thomas Y. Crowell Company.
- Stevenson, Robert. 1980. José Pablo Moncayo. The New Grove Dictionary of Music and Musicians, 6th ed. Stanley Sadie, ed. New York: Macmillan.
- Stevenson, Robert. 1952. Music in Mexico: A Historical Survey. New York: Crowell.
- Tapia Colman, Simón. 1991. Música y músicos en México (Music and Musicians in México). México City: Panorama Editorial.
- Tello, Aurelio. 1987. Salvador Contreras: Vida y obra. Colección de estudios musicológicos 1. México, D.F.: Instituto Nacional de Bellas Artes, Centro Nacional de Investigación, Documentación e Información Musical Carlos Chávez. ISBN 968-29-0718-7
- Torres-Chibrás, Armando. 1996. Sinfonietta. Notes for the Performance Program of the University of Missouri-Kansas City Chamber Orchestra, Kansas City, 26 November.
- Torres-Chibrás, Armando Ramón. 2002. "José Pablo Moncayo, Mexican Composer and Conductor: A Survey of His Life with a Historical Perspective of His Time." DMA diss., University of Missouri, Kansas City. Ann Arbor, MI: University Microfilms International. ISBN 0-493-66937-X
- Torres-Chibrás, Armando Ramón. 2009. José Pablo Moncayo: Mexico's Musical Crest. Cologne: LAP Lambert Academic Publishing. ISBN 978-3-8383-2079-3
- Weinstock, Herbert 1940. Mexican Art. Notes for concerts arranged by Carlos Chávez as part of the exhibition Twenty Centuries of Mexican Art (May). New York: The Museum of Modern Art.
- Zepeda Moreno, José Kamuel. 2005. Vida y obra de José Pablo Moncayo. Guadalajara, Jalisco, México: Gobierno de Jalisco, Secretaría de Cultura.
