= Conservatorio Nacional de Música (Mexico) =

Coordinates: 19.43231°N 99.20741°W

Escuela Nacional de Música (National School of Music)
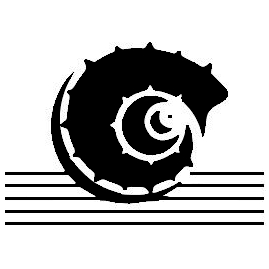

Location
- Mexico City; Mexico

Information
- Type: Public
- Established: 1866
- Enrollment: Approximately 1,200
- Campus: Urban
- Website: INBAL Official Page

The Conservatorio Nacional de Música (CNM) (National Conservatory of Music, in Spanish) is a music conservatory located in the Polanco neighborhood of Mexico City, Mexico.

== History ==
The Conservatory was founded on July 1, 1866, by the priest, teacher and choir conductor Agustín Caballero, with the support of the Mexican Philharmonic Society (Sociedad Filarmónica Mexicana) and Emperor Maximilian I.

It is the oldest official school of music in Mexico City (the oldest conservatory in Mexico and in the Americas is the Conservatorio de las Rosas in Morelia, Michoacán, Mexico, created in 1743), and it is the host institution of the oldest symphonic orchestra in the country (Orquesta Sinfónica del Conservatorio Nacional, founded in 1881).

Since March 18, 1949, its campus is located in the Polanco section of Mexico City in an architectural complex designed and built by Mario Pani.

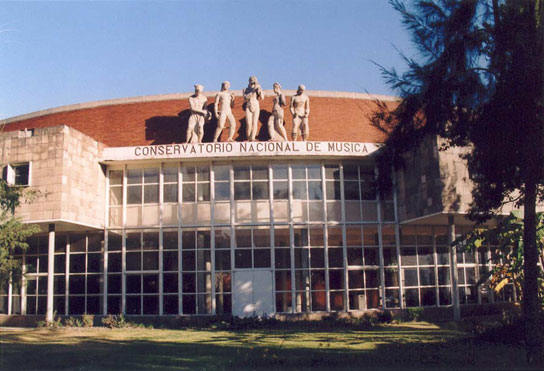
Front view of the National Conservatory of Music of Mexico.

== Noted alumni ==
- Juan Arvizu, lyric tenor.
- Yael Bitrán, historian, translator, and musicologist
- Carlos Chávez, composer and conductor
- Julián Carrillo, composer, conductor and theorist
- Nestor Mesta Chayres, lyric tenor
- Plácido Domingo, opera singer and conductor
- Blas Galindo, composer and conductor
- Luis Garcia-Renart, cellist
- Mario Lavista, composer and teacher
- Eduardo Mata, composer and conductor
- José Pablo Moncayo, composer and conductor
- Jorge Federico Osorio, pianista
- Carlos Prieto, cellist
- Carlos Miguel Prieto, conductor
- Felix Carrasco, conductor
- Silvestre Revueltas, composer and conductor
- Antonio Castillo de la Gala, pianist and composer
- Eduardo Diazmuñoz, composer, conductor and arranger
- María Teresa Rodríguez, pianist
- Javier Torres Maldonado, composer
- Luis Humberto Ramos, clarinetist
- Humberto Hernández Medrano, composer
- Salvador Contreras, clarinetist
- Ricardo Bernal, tenor
- Saul Bitran, violinist
- Rolando Villazón, tenor
- Jose carlos de la vega basulto, pianist
- Francisco de Paula León Olea, composer
- Arturo Márquez, composer
- Jorge Alejandro Fernández, trumpet, singing
- Alfredo Daza, baritone
- Verónica Tapia, composer
- Gloria Tapia, composer, musicologist
- Juan R. Ramírez Hernández, violinist, composer, conductor

== Noted professors ==
(main discipline(s) indicated)

- Gerónimo Baqueiro Foster, music history
- Eliosa de Baqueiro, music history
- Gustavo Campa, composition and director of the Conservatorio
- Julián Carrillo, composition
- Carlos Chávez, composition
- Ernesto Enríquez, music history
- Blas Galindo, composition
- Rodolfo Halffter, composition, music theory
- Eduardo Hernández Moncada, choir conducting, piano, harmony, opera ensembles
- Candelario Huízar, harmony, counterpoint and analysis
- Mario Lavista, composition
- Agustín Loera, Mexican culture history
- Armando Luna Ponce, composition
- Manuel María Ponce, composition
- Carlos Vázquez, piano
- Laura Mendez
- Vicente T. Mendoza, music history
- José Pablo Moncayo, composition, conducting
- Salvador Novo, Mexican literature
- Julián Orbón, composition
- Angelica Morales von Sauer, piano
- Carlos Pellicer, Mexican literature
- Silvestre Revueltas, violin, chamber music, composition, conducting
- María Teresa Rodríguez, piano
- José Rolón, harmony, counterpoint and fugue
- Jesús C. Romero, music history
- Luis Sandi, choir conducting
- Henryk Szeryng, violin
- Victor Loyo, piano, guitar
- Antonio Castillo de la Gala, piano, composition
- Jorge Alejandro Fernández, trumpet, singing
- Gloria Tapia, composer, musicologist
