= Xalapa Symphony Orchestra =

Mexican orchestra

Orquesta Sinfónica de Xalapa
- Orchestra
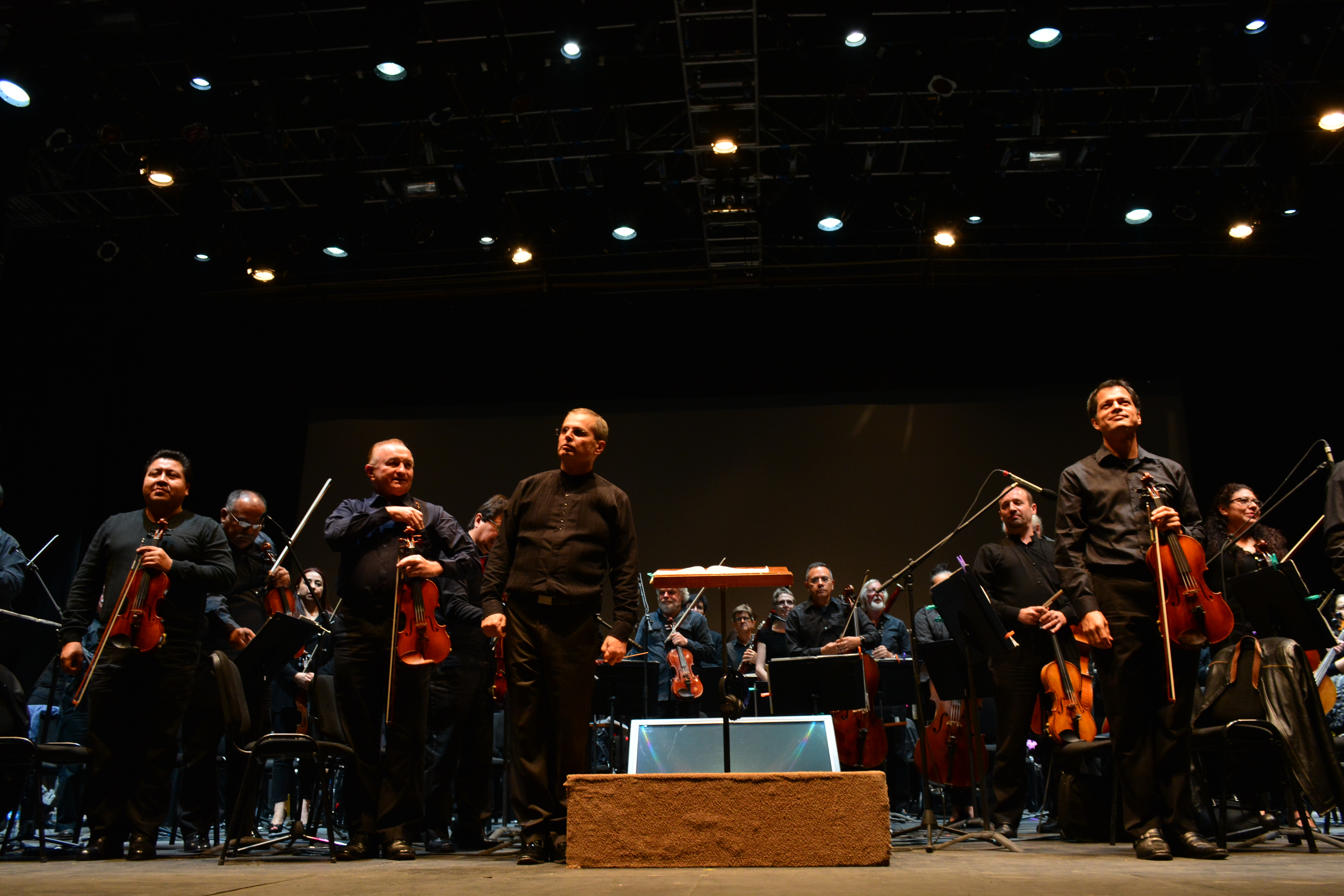
- The orchestra during the Festival Internacional Cervantino
- Founded: 1929
- Location: Xalapa, Veracruz, Mexico
- Website: www.orquestasinfonicadexalapa.com/index.php#&panel1-1

The Orquesta Sinfónica de Xalapa is a Mexican orchestra located in the city of Xalapa, the capital of the state of Veracruz. It was founded in 1929, and is considered the oldest symphony orchestra in Mexico.

== History ==
The orchestra was established by Adalberto Tejeda Olivares, a patron of the arts, in his second term as Governor of the state of Veracruz. Members were recruited from the state band, and the orchestra's first performance was on 21 August 1929 in the "Teatro Lerdo" in Xalapa city.

In its first performance the orchestra comprised 19 string players, 16 woodwind players, 3 drummers, and a piano player, under the direction of first violin Juan Lomán y Bueno. In 1975, the Orquesta Sinfónica de Xalapa Symphony became part of Universidad Veracruzana .

Since 1929, the Orquesta Sinfónica de Xalapa plays with prestigious conductors and soloists like Hermann Scherchen, Fritz Reiner, Neeme Järvi, Julián Carrillo, José Iturbi, Bruno Campanella, Eduardo Mata, Yoel Levi, Fabio Mechetti, Krzysztof Penderecki, Pierre Fournier, Horacio Gutiérrez, Claudio Arrau, Mstislav Rostropovich, Henryk Szeryng, Emil Gilels, Ruggiero Ricci, Michael Rabin, Alfred Brendel, Plácido Domingo, Andrea Bocelli, Vladimir Spivakov, Grant Johannesen, Jeffery Meyer and others.

Nationally, the OSX has hosted important events in the artistic life of Mexico, among them the Festival and International Cello Competition Pablo Casals ( 1959 ), which the legendary Pablo Casals, along with Heitor Villa-Lobos, André Navarra, Zara Nelsova and Mstislav Rostropovich, among others. The orchestra represented Mexico in the Europalia Festival (1993) and has done some international tours in Belgium, the Netherlands, Luxembourg, Germany, and Guatemala, being recognized as the " best ambassador of music and Mexican creation ."

On August 25, 2013, the Orquesta Sinfónica de Xalapa performed the first concert in its new concert hall at the Centro Cultural Tlaqná, with 1,285 seats. Tlaqná has other two minor concert halls, with 350 and 200 seats.

== Conductors ==
- Juan Lomán y Bueno was the first conductor of the orchestra
- José Ives Limantour (1944–1952)
- Luis Ximénez Caballero (1952–1962)
- Francisco Savín (1963–1967)
- José Ives Limantour (1967–1969)
- Fernando Avila Navarro (1969–1975)
- Luis Herrera de la Fuente (1975–1984)
- Francisco Savín (1984–1986)
- Enrique Diemecke (1986–1987)
- José Guadalupe Flore (1987–1990)
- Francisco Savín (1990–2001)
- Carlos Miguel Prieto (2002–2008)
- Fernando Lozano Rodríguez (2008–2012)
- Lanfranco Marcelletti (2012-2020)
- Martin Lebel (since 2020)
