= Blas Galindo =

Mexican composer (1910–1993)

Blas Galindo Dimas (February 3, 1910 – April 19, 1993) was a Mexican composer.

== Biography ==
Born in San Gabriel, Jalisco, Galindo studied intermittently from 1931 to 1944 at the National Conservatory in Mexico City, studying with Carlos Chávez (composition), Candelario Huízar, José Rolón, and Manuel Rodríguez Vizcarra (piano). In 1934, he formed the Grupo de los cuatro with fellow composers Daniel Ayala, Salvador Contreras, and José Pablo Moncayo, seeking to use indigenous Mexican musical materials in art-music compositions (Stevenson 2001).

In 1941, he was an assistant at the Berkshire Music Festival at Tanglewood, and studied under Aaron Copland at the Berkshire Music Center in 1941 and again in 1942, when his orchestral suite Arroyos was performed there (Stevenson 2001). Returning to Mexico in 1942, he became a professor of composition at the National Conservatory and in 1947 was named Director of the conservatory (a position which he held until 1961) as well as director of the music department of the National Institute of Fine Arts (Conant 1977, 95–96). From 1960 to 1965, he was music director for the Symphony of the Mexican Institute of Social Security (Conant 1977, 97).

In 1947, Galindo was named Chief of the Department for the National Institute of Fine Arts. In September 1947, Chávez named him Director of the National Conservatory of Music, a title he maintained until 1961. Before this appointment he began as a student at the Conservatory, later becoming a professor of many subjects including "harmony, counterpoint, musical analysis, history of music and composition." While at the Conservatory, Galindo also conducted the student orchestra, reformed the bylaws and built a new building. In August 1949, he was invited to be an adjudicator at the fourth Chopin piano competition in Warsaw. During this visit to Europe he travelled to seven countries to officially inspect schools of music (Stevenson 2001).

In 1952, he married Ernestina Mendoza Vega. He became Director of Artistic Activities for the Mexican Social Security Institute (I.M.S.S.) in 1955 and in 1959 I.M.S.S. named him Chief of the Music Section of the Department of Social Services. In 1960, he began conducting the Social Security Institute's Symphony Orchestra. Galindo was a frequent attendee of music festivals and guest conductor of symphony orchestras. Also, he was a lecturer and editor of magazines, sometimes writing articles concerning music.

In 1960, he was able to focus on composition when he was awarded a "fellowship from the Secretary of Public Education". Galindo retired in 1965 and dedicated himself to his composition, writing some for pleasure and others for "commission". To do this, he would frequently "retreat from Mexico City to a house in the country for weeks at a time in order to immerse himself fully." To celebrate the 25th anniversary of the opening of the new building at the Conservatory, he directed the Conservatory orchestra and chorus in 1974. In July 1974, Galindo accompanied the President of Mexico with "a number of other intellectuals" to South America.

R.P. Conant wrote of Galindo, "He would, however, like to write an opera or even a cycle of operas dealing with the life of Mexico, the agitated life of Mexico from the Aztec leader Cuauhtémoc through the leaders of Mexican independence like Morelos, Juárez, Zapata, and Cardenas" (Conant 1977, ).

== Awards ==
"José Angel Lamas" prize from Secretary of Public Education; honor diploma from the Venezuelan Society of Authors and Composers; gold medal as "the best composer of the year"; diploma from the Municipality of Los Angeles, California; National Arts and Science Award for 1958–1964, presented by the President of the republic of Mexico, Adolfo Lopez Mateos

== Works ==
Galindo's compositions number over 150, and include works in a variety of styles and ensemble forces.

=== Orchestral ===
- 1940: Sones de Mariachi
- 1942: Concerto No. 1, for piano and orchestra
- 1945: Nocturno, for orchestra
- 1951: La Manda, ballet
- 1951: Suite from the ballet La manda
- 1952: Scherzo mexicano for string orchestra
- 1956: Sinfonía breve, for strings
- 1957: Symphony No. 2
- 1960: Concerto, for flute and orchestra
- 1961: Concerto No. 2, for piano and orchestra
- 1961: Symphony No. 3
- 1962: Concerto, for violin and orchestra
- 1973: Concertino. for electric guitar and orchestra
- 1984: Concerto, for cello and orchestra
- Homenaje a Cervantes, suite
- Letanía erótica
- Obertura mexicana no. 2, for piano and orchestra
- Poema de Neruda, for string orchestra
- Concerto, for flute and band
- Concerto, for guitar and band

=== Vocal works ===
- 1939: Jicarita
- 1939: Mi querer pasaba el río
- 1939: Paloma blanca
- 1946: Cantata a la Patria, cantata based on the poem Suave Patria by Ramón López Velarde, for mixed choir and orchestra
- 1947: Two Songs, for voice and piano
- 1947: Three Songs, for voice and piano (Hoover 2010, 236; Stevenson 2001)
- 1948: Me Gusta Cuando Callas, after Pablo Neruda
- 1957: Cantata Homenaje a Benito Juárez
- 1965: Letania erótica para la paz, cantata on the poem by G. Álvarez
- 1975: Cinco canciones a la madre muerta, for voice and piano
- Dos Corazones for mixed choir
- Arrullo, for soloist and orchestra
- Canciones de Jalisco
- Madre mía cuando muera, for soprano and orchestra
- Segundo himno de Jalisco

=== Chamber music ===
- 1947: Sonata, for clarinet and piano
- 1948: Sonata, for cello and piano
- 1956: Sonata, for violin and piano
- 1961: Piano Quintet
- 1961: Suite, for violin and piano
- 1972: String Quartet

=== Solo piano ===
- 1935: La lagartija
- 1936: Suite No. 2
  1. Impresión
  2. Caricatura de vals
  3. Jalisciense
- 1937: Sombra, Preludio
- 1937: Prelude
- 1938: Llano alegre
- 1939: Danzarina, waltz
- 1941: Fugue in C
- 1944: Allegro para una sonata
- 1944: Prelude
- 1945: Five Preludes
- 1945: Y ella estaba triste, Preludio
- 1952: Seven Pieces
- 1964-1973: Piezas infantiles
- 1976: Sonata
- 1987: Preludio No. 6

=== Cello ===
- Sonata for unaccompanied cello

=== Guitar ===
- Suplica de Amor

=== Film scores ===
- 1955 Raices
