= Rosa Guraieb =

Mexican pianist, music educator and composer (1931–2014)

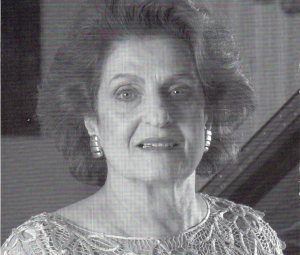
Rosa Guraieb

Rosa Guraieb Kuri (20 May 1931 – 2 March 2014) was a Mexican pianist, music educator and composer of Lebanese ancestry. She was born in Matías Romero, Oaxaca, Mexico, and studied in Beirut with Michel Cheskinoff at the National Conservatory. She continued her education in Mexico studying composition with José Pablo Moncayo and piano with Salvador Ordones Ochoa at the Conservatory of Mexico, then at Yale University (1954) and in Bayreuth, Germany. She studied with Carlos Chavez between 1962-1965. She continued her studies with Mario Lavista and Daniel Catan.

In 2003 she was honored for her fifty years of musical activity by the 7th International Meeting of Women in Arts. In 2013 she received recognition for Lifetime Achievement by the Society of Authors and Composers of Mexico.

== Works ==
Selected works include:

=== Chamber Music ===
- Sonata for violin and piano (1978)
- String Quartet: Reminiscencias (1978)
- String Quartet, Cuarteto Il, Homenaje a Gibran (1982)
- Canto a la paz for oboe, bassoon, piano (1982)
- Impresiones for guitar (1983)

=== Piano ===
- Espacios (1983)
- Pieza ciclica (1977)
- Scriabiniana (1981)

=== Vocal ===
- Arias olvidadas, soprano and piano (1983)
- Lyrica, soprano and piano (1980)
- La yarde, soprano and piano (1969)
- Tus ojos, soprano and piano (1984)
- Vida, soprano and piano (1969)

Her works have been recorded and issued on CD, including:

- Otoño Homage to Mexican composer Rosa Guraieb (2005)
