= Yael Bitrán =

Mexican researcher and historian

Dr. Yael Bitrán
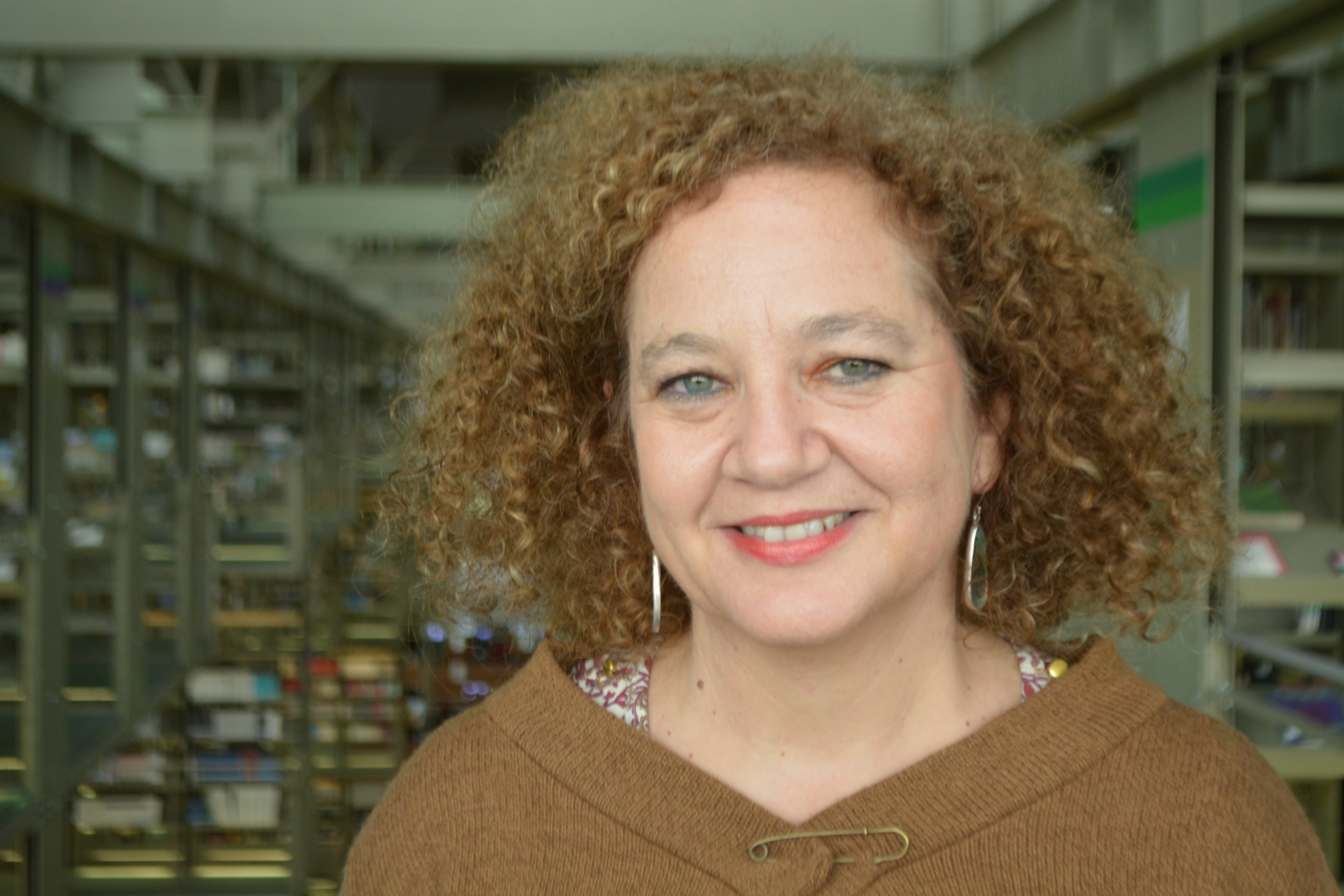
- Yael Bitrán (2017)
- Born: Yael Bitrán Goren; 1965 (age 60–61); Santiago de Chile, Chile
- Occupations: Historian; translator; musicologist

Academic background
- Education: Royal Holloway, University of London
- Thesis: Musical Women and Identity-Building in Early Independent Mexico (1821-1854) (2012)

Yael Bitrán Goren (Santiago de Chile, 1965) is a Chilean-born naturalized Mexican historian, translator, and musicologist.

== Education ==
She studied piano at the Conservatorio Nacional de Música (CNM). She has a degree in history from the Faculty of Philosophy and Letters of the National Autonomous University of Mexico (UNAM). She has a Master's in Latin American History from the University of North Carolina at Chapel Hill in the United States and a Ph.D. in musicology from the Royal Holloway, University of London.

== Career and research ==
She was the coordinator of the Mexican committee of the Répertoire International de Littérature Musicale (RILM). She is part of the editorial board of the Mexican musicology magazine Heterofonía. Since 2014, she is the director of the Centro Nacional de Investigación, Documentación e Información Musical «Carlos Chávez» (CENIDIM) of the Instituto Nacional de Bellas Artes y Literatura. In addition to being a researcher at the same national center since 2000, Bitrán is a postgraduate music professor at the UNAM. She belongs to the National System of Researchers, Level I.

Her research deals with gender, cultural studies; the social history of music, women, identity, reception and circulation of music; traveling musicians of the 19th century in Mexico; and the music press of the 19th century. She was a researcher of musical content in radio stations Opus 94 and Radio Educación.

== Awards and honours ==
- Award for Academic Performance in Research, second place, awarded by the National Institute of Fine Arts, 2013.
- Raúl Guerrero Award from the National Institute of Anthropology and History for Research and Dissemination of Musical Heritage in the category of "Award for the best product for the dissemination of musical heritage", 2011.
- Marcos and Celia Maus Award from the Faculty of Philosophy and Letters of the UNAM. Honorable mention for the best Bachelor's thesis in the class of 1991–1992, 1994.
- Francisco Javier Clavijero Award from INAH. Honorific mention. Award for the best undergraduate thesis in history at a national level, 1994.

== Selected works ==
- Bitrán, Yael (2001). México, historia y alteridad: perspectivas multidisciplinarias sobre la cuestión indígena (in Spanish). Universidad Iberoamericana. ISBN 978-968-859-438-4.
- Bitrán, Yael; Miranda, Ricardo (2002). Diálogo de resplandores: Carlos Chávez y Silvestre Revueltas (in Spanish). INBA. ISBN 978-970-18-8409-6.
