= Verónica Tapia =

Mexican composer

Verónica Tapia-Carreto (born January 12, 1961) is a Mexican composer, long resident in Canada.

A native of Puebla, Puebla, Tapia was educated at the Taller de Composición of Federico Ibarra Groth and at the Conservatorio Nacional de Música. Later she attended the Johns Hopkins University. At the University of York her supervisor was Nicola LeFanu; she received her master's degree there in 1996. In 2006 she was awarded a doctoral degree by the University of Calgary, at which she later taught. She has since joined the faculty of the conservatory at Mount Royal University. She has composed chamber music and works for children, as well as for orchestra; she has also written electroacoustic and computer music.
