= Yolanda Moreno Rivas =

Mexican pianist, musicologist, and teacher (1937–1994)

Yolanda Moreno Rivas (Mexico City, 1937- Mexico City, 1994) was a Mexican pianist, teacher and musicologist.

== Life ==
She began her musical education with her mother who taught her piano. She then studied with Angélica Morales in Mexico and later in Germany. In 1957, the Polish government gave her the Chopin prize for Mexican pianists. She lived in Paris for two years as a student at the Schola Cantorum and was also a pupil of Bernard Flavigny in France and in Mexico. She gave many recitals and played as soloist with the Orquesta Filarmónica de la UNAM, Orquesta Sinfónica de Xalapa and with Orquesta Sinfónica de Durango. She obtained a degree in Hispanic Literature at the Universidad Hispanoamericana and in 1969 she began to write in the music section in the magazine "Siempre", quit her soloist career and began life as a researcher. From 1972, she was teacher at the National School of Music in UNAM.

She was author of the three main essays on Mexican music: Historia de la Música Popular Mexicana (History of Mexican popular music), Rostros del Nacionalismo en la música mexicana (Mexican nationalism in music and its many aspects) and La Composición en México en el siglo XX ( Mexican Music Composition in the 20th century).

== Sources ==
- Casares, Emilio. Diccionario de la música Española e Hispanoamericana. Sociedad general de autores y editores. (in Spanish)
