= Francisco de Paula León Olea =

Mexican Activist and Musician

Francisco de Paula León Olea (1951-January 2026) was an architect, musician, author, and businessman from Mexico City, Mexico. He was also notable for his political involvement in the Mexican transition to democracy, as well as for his visionary architectural projects.

== Early life and education ==
Francisco de Paula León Olea was born in Mexico City, Mexico in 1951 to Gabriel León and Martha Olea. One of his grandfathers was Teofilo Olea y Leyva, one of The Seven Sages of Mexico.

He studied sacred music at the seminary of the Holy Catholic Fathers, then studied piano and piano composition at the National School of Music of the National Autonomous University of Mexico. He had a master’s degree in International Relations from American University, where he was part of the board of trustees.

== Music career ==
He studied at Conservatorio Nacional de Música and in 1989 he became the first Mexican composer of Symphonic Requiem, which was inaugurated in 1990 by the Philarmonic Orchestra of the National Autonomous University of Mexico. In 1994, he composed the Fantasy of the Universe, which was performed by the International Music Festival of Morelia México. He left his music career after the death of his father. In 2023, he premiered his coral symphony Poimandres with the Philarmonic Orchestra of San Luis Potosí, Mexico.

== Politics ==
In 2000, de Paula León Olea started the Citizen’s Parliament and Republican Action Movement to support the democratic transition of Mexico. In 2002, the Republican Action Movement applied to create the Republican Party headed by de Paula León Olea, who was the president of the organization.

De Paula León Olea also founded an editorial company responsible for publishing the magazine Conciencia Mexicana. During Mexico's political transition, the magazine published interviewed political leaders Kofi Annan, Hillary Clinton, and Václav Havel. In 1999, the magazine interviewed ex-President Carlos Salinas, who was in exile in Dublin at the time.

During this time period, De Paula León Olea wrote and published political articles in both Conciencia Mexicana and Mexican newspapers in which he criticized the corruption of the Mexican elite, claimed the right to more than one political party, and asked for peaceful change.

== World Trade Center ==
In the late 1980s, De Paula León Olea partnered with Alfredo Ruiz Suárez to redesign the building that was going to be the Hotel de México and proposed to turn it into an international business center instead. The World Trade Center Mexico City opened in November 1994. After this, De Paula León Olea worked with Guy F. Tozzoli, proposed by Mikhail Gorbachov for the Nobel Peace Prize, to franchise the World Trade Center Association in 420 cities.

== The Giordano Bruno University ==
De Paula León Olea was the President of the Board of Giordano Bruno University. He worked with Ervin Laszlo to launch this online university in Budapest in 2012, in an event that was attended by famous personalities from all over the world.

== The International Sustainability Center ==
From 2022 until his death, De Paula León Olea worked in the creation and development of an ambitious project called The International Sustainability Center (ISC), designed to address the pressing issue of global warming. He attempted to fashion the ISC as a unique space that would permanently bring together all nations, the most important companies in the world, and the brightest minds alive. In the ISC, the efforts that governments and companies carry out regarding all environmental issues will be permanently exhibited, proposing at the same time an harmonic congregation of ideas and global agreements. The ISC was initially offered to the Government of Guatemala. In September 2022, the project was welcomed by Mr. António Manuel de Oliveira Guterres, Secretary General of the United Nations. In September 2023, the ISC was officially presented to the community of nations at the United Nations Headquarters in New York City, in an event headed by high representatives of the Republic of Guatemala and Ms. Tonilyn Lim, Chief of Programmes at the United Nations Global Compact Office.

== Books ==
In addition to writing about politics, De Paula León Olea wrote about philosophy and fiction. His published books included Ianoa Coeli: A Ship of Hope in the Mexican Mad Years and Los hilos secretos de las élites,. His book, The Awakening of Mankind: Towards a Unified Theory of Man in the 21st Century, summarized his philosophy of non-subordination. His first historical-fiction novel, The Color of Heaven and Earth, was published in 2012. Other fiction included La Barcaza en el Sena and a collection of short stories called Cuentos de la vida Real. His final fiction project was La gran mentira, a novel that mixes history and philosophy to reveal a powerful plot that dates back to the very origins of Christianity.

== Awards ==
In April 2013, De Paula León Olea received the Life Time Achievement Award in Arts and Humanities presented by the Mexic-Arte Museum in Austin, Texas.
