= Salvador Contreras =

Mexican composer

Salvador Contreras Sánchez (10 November 1910 – 7 November 1982) was a Mexican composer and violinist, a member of the Grupo de los cuatro.

== Life ==
Contreras was born in Cuerámaro, Guanajuato, the son of José Contreras and Nemoria Sánchez. His musical education was at the Mexico City Conservatory, where he studied violin with Silvestre Revueltas, music theory with Candelario Huízar, and composition and conducting with Carlos Chávez. Together with Daniel Ayala Pérez, Blas Galindo, and José Pablo Moncayo, he formed the Grupo de jóvenes compositores in 1935, which later became the Grupo de los cuatro.

== Musical style ==
Contreras's early works from the 1930s and early 1940s were predominantly contrapuntal and neoclassical, with folk-like tunes and brash rhythms. His Obertura en tiempo de danza (Overture in Dance Time, 1942), for example, prominently uses measures in 7/8 and 5/8, which alternate with the more common 2/4 and 3/4. In the mid-1960s he began using serial techniques, allying him with Manuel Enríquez and losing him his former broad public appeal.

== Compositions ==
Among his best-known works are:

- Sonata, for violín and cello (1933)
- Piece for String Quartet (String Quartet No. 2) (1936)
- Música para orquesta sinfónica (1940)
- Obertura en tiempo de danza (1942)
- Cuatro canciones (1959)
- String Quartet No. 3 (1962)
- Three Movements for guitar (1963)
- Dos piezas dodecafónicas (1966)
- Cantata a Juárez (1967)
- Seven Preludes, for piano (1971)

== Discography ==
- Blas Galindo, Sones de Mariachi; Silvestre Revueltas, Sensemayá; José Pablo Moncayo, Amatzinac; Salvador Contreras, Corridos; Carlos Chávez: Symphony No. 5. Orquesta Sinfónica Nacional de México; Coro Nacional de México; Enrique Arturo Diemecke, cond. Elena Durán, flute; María Luisa Tamez, soprano. CD recording, 1 sound disc: digital, stereo, 4 3/4 in. Sony Classical CDEC 471000. [Mexico City]: Sony Music Entertainment Mexico, 1994.
