= Paso del Norte (opera) =

Opera by Victor Rasgado

Paso del Norte is a modern opera composed by Mexican Víctor Rasgado. The work is based on a play, which in turn is based on the real story of a group of migrants who become trapped in a train car on their way to the United States, with all but one succumbing to suffocation. The orchestration of the work is notable as it is a mix of modern symphony and traditional village band music. For the work’s premiere in the city of Oaxaca, the music was reorchestrated so that it could be played by a real village band, one from the small Oaxacan town of San Bartolomé Zoogocho. Since then, the work has been performed multiple times in Mexico City and Ciudad Juarez, as well as the 2014 Festival Internacional Cervantino.

== Composition ==
With a title from a Juan Rulfo short story, the work was created by Víctor Rasgado of Oaxaca, his fifth opera. Rasgado is from a prominent Oaxaca musical family, who studied composition at the Escuela Nacional de Música, the Centro de Investigación y Estudios Musicales in México and various schools in Europe. He has received various grants and awards for his work, both in Mexico and abroad. The opera is based on a play by Hugo Salcedo, called El viaje de los cantores. This play is based on a real event in the 1980s, when a group of migrants were abandoned in a broken down train car, with all but one succumbing to suffocation. The survivor was able to breathe through a small hole in the door. It was twenty years before this story was ever staged.

== Story and staging ==
The opera has eleven scenes in one act, lasting just over an hour. It has nine actors and an austere set. Sung in Spanish, the only survivor in the story becomes the narrator in the work. The work is a social reflection of the phenomenon, including the division of families and the almost complete abandonment of towns because of the lack of jobs. The lead female part represents the wives and mothers left behind after the men travel north.

The sound is unconventional for an opera, especially the orchestration, as it is a mixed of traditional Mexican rural band music and more contemporary composition. The work was originally conceived for percussion, saxophone and piano, but it was rearranged for a traditional Oaxaca rural band, becoming to first opera written in Mexico to be accompanied in this manner.

== Performances ==
The opera had its premiere in 2011 at the Macedonio Alcalá Theater in the city of Oaxaca, as part of the Eduardo Mata Festival. This first performance has a complement of thirty eight musicians, actors and directors. The musical ensemble for this performance was the San Bartolomé Zoogocho town band, chosen because half of the town’s population has migrated to the United States. Since then it has performed at various venues in Mexico City, Ciudad Juárez and in 2014, was included in the 2014 Festival Internacional Cervantino.
