= Arturo Márquez =

Mexican composer (born 1950)

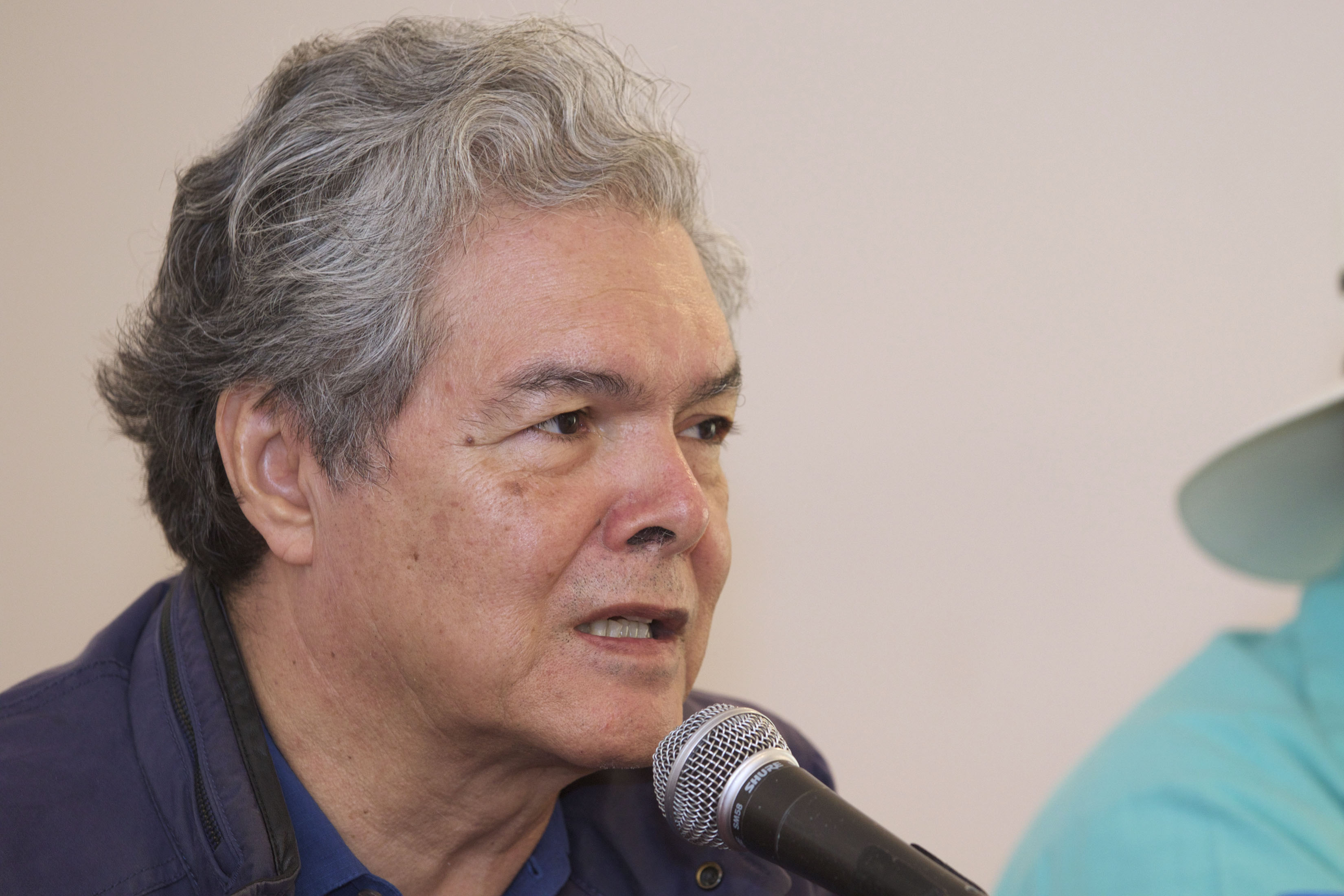
- Márquez in 2016
- Born: December 20, 1950 (age 75); Álamos, Sonora, Mexico
- Occupation: Composer

Signature
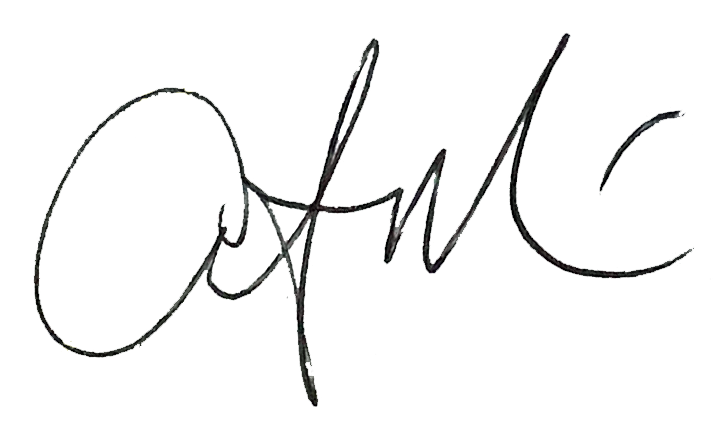

Arturo Márquez Navarro (born 20 December 1950) is a Mexican composer of orchestral music who uses musical forms and styles of his native Mexico and incorporates them into his compositions. His best known work is Danzón No. 2.

== Life ==
Márquez was born in Álamos, Sonora, in 1950 where his interest in music began. Márquez is the firstborn of nine children of Arturo Márquez and Aurora Navarro de Marquez. Márquez was the only one of the nine siblings to become a musician. Márquez's father was a mariachi musician in Mexico and later in Los Angeles. His paternal grandfather was a Mexican folk musician in the northern states of Sonora and Chihuahua. Márquez's father and grandfather exposed him to several musical styles in his childhood, particularly Mexican "salon music" which would be the impetus for his later musical repertoire.

His education began in La Puente, California where he spent his middle school and high school years. After returning to Mexico, Márquez studied at the Conservatory of Music and the Institute of Fine Arts in Mexico. He also studied privately in Paris with Jacques Castérède after receiving a scholarship from the French government.

Márquez began composing at the age of 16 and attended the Mexican Music Conservatory, where he studied piano and music theory from 1970 to 1975. Márquez studied composition from 1976 to 1979 with Federico Ibarra, Joaquín Gutiérrez Heras, and Héctor Quintanar. In the U.S., he was awarded a Fulbright Scholarship and in 1990 obtained a MFA in composition from California Institute of the Arts in Valencia, California.

Until the 1990s, Márquez's music was largely unknown outside his native country, which changed when he was introduced to the world of Latin ballroom dancing, which led to his most famous compositions, the Danzones. His music incorporates forms and styles of his native Mexico. The Danzones are based on the music of the Veracruz region of Mexico. Danzón No. 2 was included on the program of the Simon Bolívar Youth Orchestra conducted by Gustavo Dudamel on their 2007 tour of Europe and the United States. The composition has also opened the door for the discovery of other pieces by the composer that are increasingly being performed throughout the world and extensively in Latin America. His Danzones are used for ballet productions throughout the world. Márquez is a popular composer among the Latin American public and is widely recognized as one of the most important Mexican composers of his generation.

Arturo Márquez lives with his family in Mexico City.

== Awards ==
Márquez has been the recipient of several prestigious awards and honors. He was awarded the National Prize for Arts and Sciences (Mexico) by President Felipe Calderón on December 14, 2009. In February 2006, he made history when he became the first musician to receive "La Medalla De Oro De Bellas Artes de Mexico" (Gold Medal of Fine Arts of Mexico), one of Mexico's most coveted award for career accomplishments in the fine arts. Other awards have included the Medalla Mozart (awarded by the Austrian embassy), Medalla Dr. Alfonso Ortiz Tirado, California Institute of the Arts Distinguished Alumnus Award, Unión de Cronistas de Música y de Teatro, and many others. In 2024, Marquez was awarded two Latin Grammies for Best Classical Contemporary Composition (Gustavo Dudamel, Anne Akiko Meyers) and Best Classical Album (Los Angeles Philharmonic).

Márquez has also been honored at several musical festivals throughout Latin America where his music has been performed extensively and has obtained a large following. In 2005, the Arturo Márquez International Music Festival was commenced in Caracas, Venezuela in honor of the composer. In 2014, Márquez was honored as composer-in-residence during the Caribbean Tour of YOA Orchestra of the Americas.

== Music ==
- Moyolhuica y Enigma, for flute (1981)
- Mutismo, for two pianos (1983)
- Gestación, for orchestra (1983)
- Concierto interdisciplinario con músicos y fotógrafos (1985)
- Son, for orchestra (1986)
- Persecución, for orchestra (1986)
- Ciudad rota, for voice, piano, percussion, and string orchestra (1987)
- Sonata Mayo, for harpe (1989)
- En Clave, for piano (1988–1990)
- Passages, ballet (1990)
- Danzón, for synthesizer (1990)
- Noche de luna, for chorus and orchestra (1991)
- Tierra, ballet (1991)
- La Nao, ballet (1992)
- Sehuailo, for two flutes and orchestra (1992)
- Son a Tamayo, for harp, percussion and tape. Featured at the 1996 World Harp Congress; along with Música para Mandinga, is an electroacoustic composition. (1992)
- Paisajes Bajo el Signo de Cosmos, for orchestra (1993)
- Zacamandú en la yierba, for piano (1993)
- Los cuatro narcisos, ballet (1993)
- Homenaje a Gismonti, for string quartet (1993)
- Vals au meninos da rua, for orchestra (1993)
- Cristal del Tiempo, ballet (1994)
- Danzón No. 1, for orchestra (1994)
- Danzón No. 2, for orchestra (1994)
- Danzón No. 3, for flute, guitar and small orchestra (1994)
- Zarabandeo, for clarinet and piano (1995)
- Danzón No. 4, for chamber orchestra (1996)
- Octeto Malandro, for large orchestra (1996)
- Danza de Mediodía, for wind quintet (1996)
- Danzón No. 5, for saxophone quartet (1997)
- Días de Mar y Río, for piano (1997)
- Máscaras (Máscara Flor, Máscara Son, La Pasión según San Juan de Letrán, La Pasión según Marcos) (1998)
- Danza sylvestre, for orchestra (1999)
- Espejos en la arena (Son de tierra candente, Lluvia en la arena, Polca derecha-izquierda), for cello and orchestra (2000)
- Danzón No. 6 ("Puerto Calvario"), for saxophone and orchestra (2001)
- Danzón No. 7, for orchestra (2001)
- Danzón No. 8, ("Homenaje to Maurice Ohana"), for orchestra (2004)
- Sueños (Textos de Eduardo Langagne), cantata (2005)
- Conga del Fuego Nuevo, for orchestra (2005)
- Los Sueños cantate scénique, for mezzo-soprano, baritone, mixed chorus, narrator, dancers and orchestra (2006)
- De Juarez a Maximiliano, (2006)
- Solo Rumores, for solo piano (commissioned by Ana Cervantes) (2006)
- Marchas de duelo y de ira, for orchestra (2008)
- Cuatro danzas cubants, for orchestra (2009)
- Rapsodia Tlaxcalteca, for orchestra (2009)
- Leyenda de Miliano, for orchestra (2010)
- Danzón 7 (reissue) (2012)
- Alas (a Malala), for clarinet, orchestra, and choir (2013)
- De la Mora a las Raíces, (Commissioned by UAEMex for its 60th anniversary) (2017)
- Danzón No. 9, (2017)
- Concierto de Otoño, for trumpet (2018)
- Fandango, for Anne Akiko Meyers violin concerto (2020)
- Déjà Vu (Relicario de Córdoba), for Euphonium and Piano (2022)
- Concerto Mistico y Profano for Guitar and Orchestra, for Pablo Sáinz Villegas (2025)
