= Juan de Lienas =

Mexican composer

Juan de Lienas (fl. 1617-1654 ) was a composer active in Latin America during the early to mid-17th century. He also served as a chapel master and conductor in the Catholic Church. Much of his life is still a mystery, but what is known comes from accounts in the only two manuscripts that include his compositions: El Codice del Convento del Carmen and the Newberry Choirbooks. Some of these comments are unflattering to the composer, insulting his appearance and personality. He is identified as a cacique (a native of noble birth), an Indian, and a married man, all of which may have kept him from higher standing within the church. One scholar indicates that he may have been born in Spain. Most scholars place him in Mexico in the employ of the convent connected to the cathedral of Mexico City, but one asserts that he also worked in Havana. His music is indicative of the early Renaissance, following the Polyphonic styles of composers such as Francisco Guerrero and Cristóbal de Morales. He is often associated with Juan Hernandez, Fernando Franco, and Francisco López. The latter two also had compositions in the Carmen Codex. His known compositions include: two masses (one of which is a Requiem), eleven motets, three magnificats, and two sets of lamentations. The two manuscripts which include his music may have at one point been connected. Both include his Salve Regina for 4 voices, Lamentation for 4 voices, and Magnificat for 5 voices. His compositions were first brought to the states by means of the Newbery Choirbooks, which are still performed today.

== Musical style ==
Lienas' compositions are very skilled, and several compositional trends can be found throughout his music. His vocal lines were quite demanding, the ranges for each part quite high, and the sonorities often in 5 parts. He is skilled at writing for double choir, sometimes placing instruments on the lower voices. His compositions can be analyzed in terms of modern tonality, focusing less on modal music. This helps to bolster the ideals of fluid musical styles instead of the harsh cutoffs implied by musical periods. While his music reflects the styles of early Renaissance, his dates put him in the Baroque period, and his tonalities show that, while he composed in earlier styles, he was still moving towards more modern compositional ideals.

== Selected discography ==
- Juan de Lienas, Missa. Les Chemins du Baroque 8: Messe de l'Assomption de la Vierge. Compañia Musical de las Américas dir. Josep Cabré, K617
- Nicolas Gombert, Ferdinand de Lassus, Juan De Lienas; Messe de la Bataille en Nouvelle Espagne - Mexique es:Cristina García Banegas K617
- Juan de Lienas, Office de Complies, Trésors des Couvents, ensemble Vox Cantoris, dir. Jean-Christophe Candau, Psalmus
