= Gloria Tapia (composer) =

Mexican composer and musicologist

Gloria Tapia Mendoza (April 16, 1927 - March 28, 2008) was a Mexican composer and musicologist.

Born in Araró, Zinapécuaro, Michoacán, Tapia studied composition and musicology at the Conservatorio Nacional de Música, later becoming an instructor at the same institution; she also studied philosophy and Latin American studies at the National Autonomous University of Mexico. For much of her career she worked to promote contemporary music in her home country; among the roles in which she served was that of general coordinator for culture and musical education of the Dirección General de Acción Educativa. She belonged to the Liga de Compositores de Música de Concierto de México, of which organization she was at one time president. Tapia composed a good deal of music for orchestra during her career; she also produced chamber music, including works for piano and for guitar; choral pieces; and songs.
