= Vicente T. Mendoza =

Mexican musicologist, composer and artist

Vicente Teódulo Mendoza Gutiérrez (1894 in Cholula, Puebla – 1964 in Mexico City) was a Mexican musicologist, composer and artist. He is best known for his studies on the Mexican corrido.

In 1907 when Vicente T. Mendoza was 13 years old, he went to Mexico City where he studied piano and composition at the National Conservatory. At the same time he studied drawing. Between 1912 and 1930 he worked as a topographer. Later on, he taught solfege at the Conservatory. His main interest rests in Mexican folklore and music paleography. Along with the collaboration of Daniel Castañeda he compiled a treatise of precolumbian instruments, published in 1937 under the name Instrumental Precortesiano. He also published a comparative study of the Spanish romance and Mexican corrido El Romance Español y el Corrido Mexicano in 1939. As a composer, he arranged Mexican popular folk songs.

== Sources ==
- Slonimsky, Nicolas. Music of Latin America
