= Francisco Savín =

Mexican conductor and composer

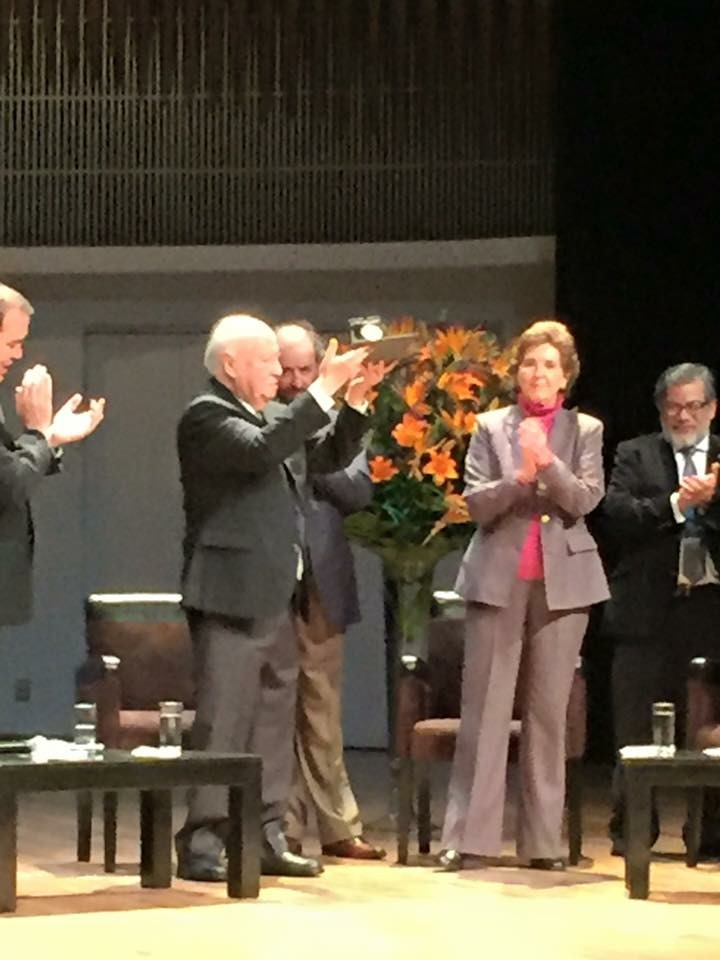
Delivery of the Bellas Artes Medal to Francisco Savín.

Francisco Savín (18 November 1929 – 26 January 2018) was a Mexican conductor and composer. Born in Mexico City, he studied composition under Rodolfo Halffter and conducting under Luis Herrera de la Fuente. He conducted the Xalapa Symphony Orchestra from 1963 to 1967, and from 1984 to 1986.
