= Víctor Rasgado =

Mexican pianist and classical composer (1959–2023)

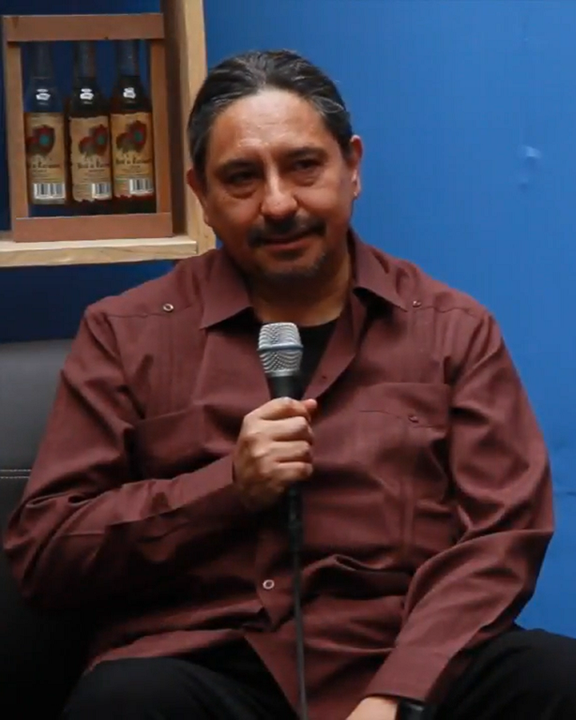
Rasgado in 2017

Víctor Rasgado (1959 – 18 January 2023) was a Mexican pianist and classical composer, whose works have been performed in Mexico, the United States, Italy, and the Netherlands.

== Biography ==
Born in Mexico City, he studied piano and composition at the Escuela Nacional de Música and the Centro de Investigación y Estudios de la Música in Mexico, the Conservatorio Giuseppe Verdi (Milan and the Accademia Chigiana (Siena). His opera Anacleto Morones was one of the winners of the Premio Orpheus for new chamber operas and was premiered in Spoleto at the Teatro Caio Melisso on 9 September 1994 in a production by Luca Ronconi. That same year his Revontulet (Fantasia for piano, percussion, and instrumental ensemble) premiered in Siena. Other notable compositions include his 2001 children's opera, El conejo y el coyote (The Rabbit and the Coyote) and Revuelos (for trumpet, piano, contrabass and percussion), performed in Carnegie Hall during the Sonidos de las Americas festival in 1994.

Rasgado died on 18 January 2023, at the age of 63.

== See also ==
- Paso del Norte (opera)
