= Marcela Rodríguez =

Mexican composer (born 1951)

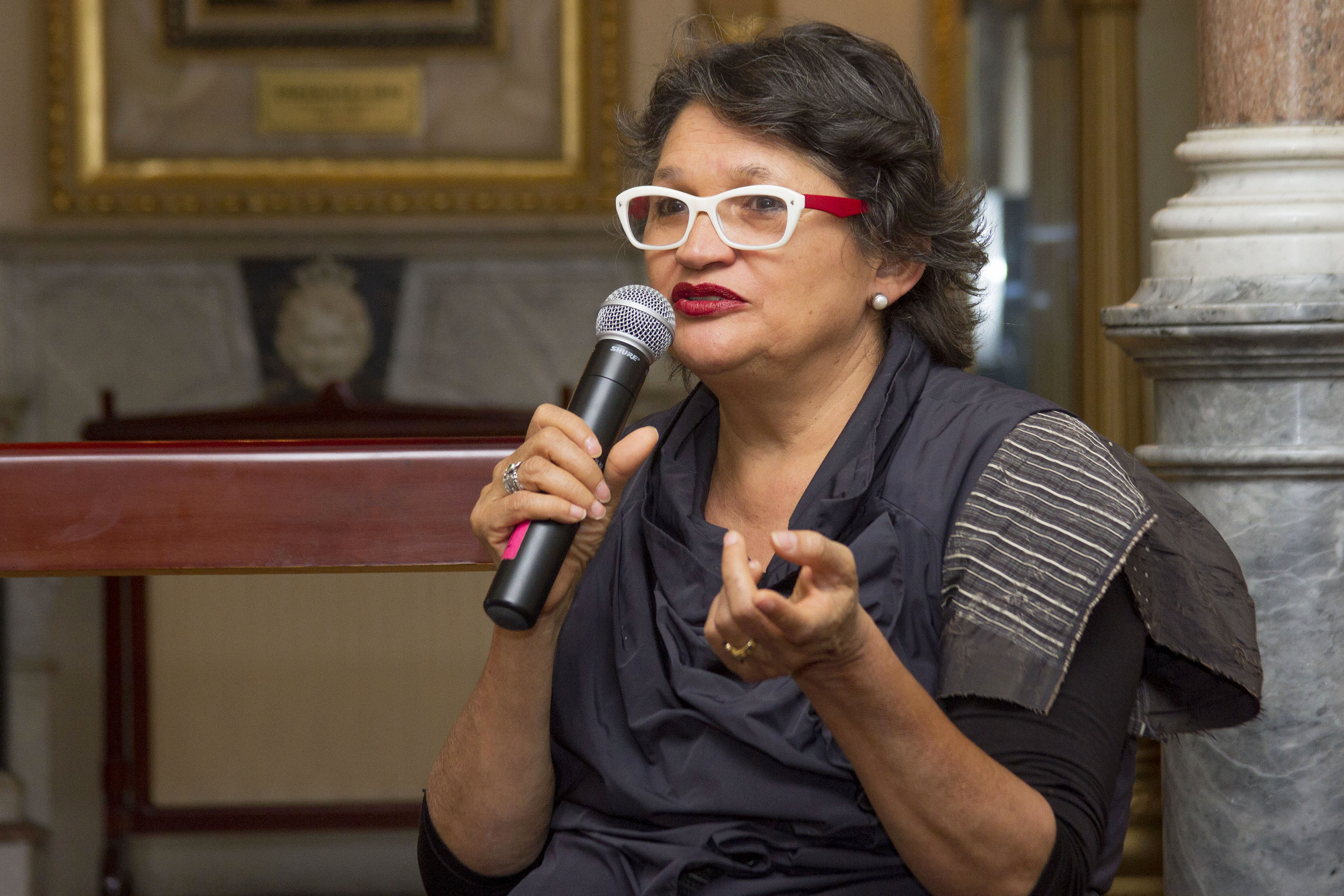
Marcela Rodríguez 2016

Marcela Rodríguez (born 18 April 1951) is a Mexican composer.

== Biography ==
Marcela Rodríguez was born in Mexico City. She studied the guitar and composition with Leo Brouwer of Cuba. She studied for a while in London, and then returned to Mexico City to study with Julio Estrada and Ma. Antonieta Lozano, Rodríguez works have been performed internationally, including the United States, Venezuela, Spain, her opera "Las Cartas de Frida" in Heidelberg, Germany, Moldavia and Greece. She has taught classes of composition for opera, dance and theater in Mexico and Spain, and at the Catholic University of Colombia and the Catholic University of Washington.

Her music composition is usually associated with natural landscapes, human nature and different cultures. Although she has received most of her music education in Mexico with Mexican composers, she claims that her music is not associated with Latin American music. By combining different cultures, her music presents a unique style that contains many music elements from different countries. European culture influences her music the most, once she said “Spain is part of my life”. Marcela Rodríguez’s work Asilah combines Arabian and Spanish cultures. The musical development in this piece reflects the geography from north Morocco, the border to Spain, to south in Morocco. The music style in this piece changes from Spanish culture gradually into Arabic culture. Asilah has the similar concept with her recent work El Horizonte which is based on natural landscape.

== Works ==
Rodriguez has composed chamber music, symphonies, concertos, opera and also for solo instruments, voice, theater and dance. Selected works include:

- La Sunamita, opera (1991), libretto by Carlos Pereda 1988
- Séneca, opera, libretto by Carlos Thiebaut (1993)
- "Las Cartas de Frida" (2011), libretto by Frida Kahlo
- "Bola Negra" text by Mario Bellatin
- La Fábula de las Regiones
- Concierto para guitarra y orquestra
- Concierto para cello y orquestra
- 2 concerts para recorder and orchestra"
- 2 concerts for piano and orchestra"
- Vértigos for four percussionists and orchestra
- "Mural" for four percussionists and Orchestra
- "Horizonte Oaxaqueño" for symphonic band and flute trio
- "Vértigo" for Symphonic Orchestra (2018)
- Violin Concert (2018)

CHAMBER MUSIC

- ASILAH for ensemble
- TRES DANZAS for ensemble
- 3 FLUTE TRÍOS
- "Nocturno" for solo guitar
- "Apocalipsis" cello solo
- "Caída" ensemble
- 4 "lumbres" for cello solo
- 4 piano solo pieces

Her music has been recorded and issued on CD. Selected recordings include:

- Séneca, Audio CD (June 13, 2006) Urtext Records, ASIN: B000FII2LQ

"Funesta" letra de Sor Juana Inés de la Cruz for soparna and ensemble

- Casi Una Pregunta, Casi Una Respuesta (Almost a Question, Almost an Answer): Latin American Piano Music in the 21st Century by Martha Marchena, Aurelio de la Vega, Marcela Rodriguez, and Carlos Alberto Vazquez, Audio CD (Jun 30, 2009) MSR Classics, ASIN: B002FKFW24
- Musica Sinfonica Mexicana Audio CD (February 18, 1997) Urtext Records, ASIN: B000005DMD
