= Daniel Ayala Pérez =

Mexican violinist, conductor, and composer

Daniel Ayala Pérez (21 July 1906 – 20 June 1975) was a Mexican violinist, conductor, and composer.

== Biography ==
Ayala was born in Abalá, Yucatán, and studied violin with Revueltas and composition with Chávez, Manuel M. Ponce, Vicente T. Mendoza, Candelario Huízar and Julián Carrillo at the Conservatorio Nacional de Música, Mexico City from 1927 to 1932. For a time he earned his living playing in the night club Salón México, a locale later celebrated in a well-known composition by Aaron Copland. In 1934 he formed, together with fellow composers Salvador Contreras, Blas Galindo and José Pablo Moncayo, the "Group of Four" -- "Grupo de los cuatro." From 1931 he was a second violinist in the Orquesta Sinfónica de México under Chávez, and directed a choir in Morelia for two years, but in 1940 returned to his native Yucatán to accept an appointment as conductor of the Police Band in Mérida. In 1942 he founded the Orquesta Típica Yukalpetén, which performs compositions by Yucatecan composers of the past and present.

In 1944 he became conductor of the newly reorganized Mérida Symphony Orchestra and director of the Yucatán Conservatory. In 1955 he moved to Veracruz to take up the directorship of the school of music there, and also worked for the Veracruz Institute of Fine Arts.

He died in 1975 in Xalapa, Veracruz.

== Compositions ==
As a composer, Ayala's first major success was with a symphonic poem, Uchben X'coholte (1933), whose title means "In an Ancient Cemetery" in the Mayan language. His most ambitious work is the ballet El Hombre Maya (The Mayan Man), but the symphonic poem Tribu (1934) is perhaps his best-known work, thanks to a recording made in 1956 by the Orquesta Sinfónica Nacional under Luís Herrera de la Fuente (Musart 3-LP set MCDC 3033, included on the single disc Viva México! released in the USA on Capitol T-10083). After 1944 his conducting and administrative duties occupied more and more of his time, and he composed comparatively little.

== Selected works ==
=== Ballets ===
- El hombre maya (1939)
- La gruta diabólica, for chamber orchestra (1940)

=== Orchestra ===
- Cinco piezas infantiles, for string orchestra (1933)
- Tribu, sym. poem, (1934)
  - En la llanura (On the Prairie)
  - La serpiente negra (The Black Serpent)
  - La danza del fuego (Fire Dance)
- Paisaje (Landscape), suite, (1935)
- Panoramas de México, suite (1936)
  - Sonora
  - Veracruz
  - Yucatán
- Mi viaje a Norte América (My North-American Journey), suite (1947)
- Acuarela nocturna (en San Salvador), op. 20 (1949)
- Suite veracruzana (1957)
- Concertino for Piano and Orchestra (1974)

=== Vocal ===
- Uchben X'coholte (In an Ancient Cemetery), for soprano and chamber orchestra (1931)
- Cuatro canciones, for soprano and piano (1932)
- El grillo (The Cricket, words by Daniel Castañeda), for soprano, clarinet, violin, piano, and rattle (1933)
- U kayil chaac (Mayan rain song), for soprano and chamber orchestra with indigenous percussion (1934)
- Suite infantil (Children's Suite), for soprano and chamber orchestra (1936)
  - Duerme. Moderato cantabile
  - El aire. Allegro
  - El caimán. Andantino
  - El violín. Andante
  - El indigena. Allegretto
  - El gallo. Allegro
- Los pescadores Seris (The Seri Fishermen), for voice and chamber orchestra with indigenous percussion (1938)
- Los danzantes Yaquis (The Yaqui Dancers), for voice and chamber orchestra with indigenous percussion (1938)

=== Piano ===
- Radiogramma (1931)

=== Chamber music ===
- String Quartet (1933)
- Vidrios rotos (Broken Windows), for oboe, clarinet, bassoon, horn, piano (1938)
