= Candelario Huízar =

Mexican composer and musician (1883–1970)

Candelario Huízar García de la Cadena (2 February 1883 – 3 May 1970, Mexico City) was a Mexican composer, musician and music teacher. He completed four symphonies, leaving a fifth unfinished, and a string quartet, but is remembered most for his tone poems. He also left celebrated arrangements of works by Vivaldi and Bach, among others.

== Early life ==
Huízar was born in Jerez, Zacatecas into a working-class family, and he became a goldsmith apprentice at a very early age. Huízar taught himself to play the guitar as a child.

== Career ==
Huízar studied saxophone under Narciso Arriaga, and in 1892 he became a member of the Municipal Marching Band of Jerez. He later played the viola in the string quartet of Enrique Herrera, and studied harmony with Aurelio Elías. He became a member of Banda de Música del Primer Cuadro del Batallón de Zacatecas. He also participated in the Mexican Revolution as a member of a brass band.

In 1917 moved to Mexico City, and became a member of the Marching Band of the North Division there. In the following year he joined the Presidential Guard Marching Band led by Melquíades Campos.

Huízar enrolled in the National Conservatory of music, where he studied horn under the supervision of Arturo Rocha, harmony with Estanislao Mejía and Aurelio Barrios y Morales, and composition with Gustavo Campa and Rafael J. Tello. In 1920 he was appointed copyist for the National Conservatory, where shortly after he became a librarian.

In 1924 he graduated as a horn player and composer, joined theater orchestras, and played horn in the Symphonic Orchestra of the Conservatory, and worked there as a professor of music analysis until 1952, studying harmony, composition and instrumentation. He was also chronicler and librarian of the Orquestra Sinfónica Nacional from 1928 to 1937.

Huízar composed many instrumental pieces for chamber orchestra, symphonic orchestra and choir, and he also set many traditional Mexican vocal melodies to instrumental arrangements. He wrote four symphonies which are part of the repertoire of many Mexican orchestras

In 1951 he was awarded the National Award of Science and Arts in Bellas Artes.

Late in his life Huízar suffered a stroke that paralyzed him almost completely. His fifth symphony was left unfinished, and he died 3 May 1970, in Mexico City.

Beginning in 2010, each year the Calendario Huízar musical conference, named "SURCO" after one of Huizar's symphonic poems, takes place at the Hinojosa Theater in the city of Jerez.

== Works ==
Huízar composed four symphonies, symphonic poems and other orchestral works, choral music, songs and piano pieces and orchestrations of works by Bach, Vivaldi and Juventino Rosas.

- Imágenes, 1919 – poema sinfónico
- A Una Onda, 1928 – romanza
- Sonata para clarinete y fagot, 1931
- Pueblerinas, poema sinfónico, 1931
- Surco, poema sinfónico, 1935
- Ochpanixtli, sinfonía, 1936
- Concierto Grueso, 1937
- Sinfonía No. 4, 1942

== Discography ==
- Mi Alma Mexicana (My Mexican Soul)
