= Luis Herrera de la Fuente =

Mexican musician (1916–2014)

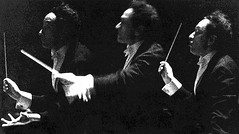
Conducting The Orquesta Sinfónica Nacional of Mexico in the city of Monterrey, Mexico in 1970

Luis Herrera de la Fuente (April 25, 1916 – December 5, 2014) was a Mexican conductor, pianist, violinist, composer and writer of the 20th century. De la Fuente gained many recognitions and awards in Mexico and worldwide. He conducted the Orquesta Sinfónica Nacional of Mexico for 18 years. He was also conductor of the Orquesta Sinfónica de Minería.

Herrera de la Fuente was born in Mexico City. He began his formal education in Escuela Nacional de Música de la UNAM with Estanislao Mejía and José F. Vázquez. He studied piano with Santos Carlos, violin with Luis G. Saloma, singing with David Silva, and composition with Rodolfo Halffter. He began his practice in conducting with Sergiu Celibidache and in Zurich with Hermann Scherchen. He served as conductor of the Oklahoma City Symphony Orchestra from 1978 to 1988. His research in folk and colonial music can be found in the Instituto Nacional de Bellas Artes. He died on December 5, 2014, at the age of 98.

== See also ==
- The Conductor (sculpture)
