= José Rolón =

Mexican composer

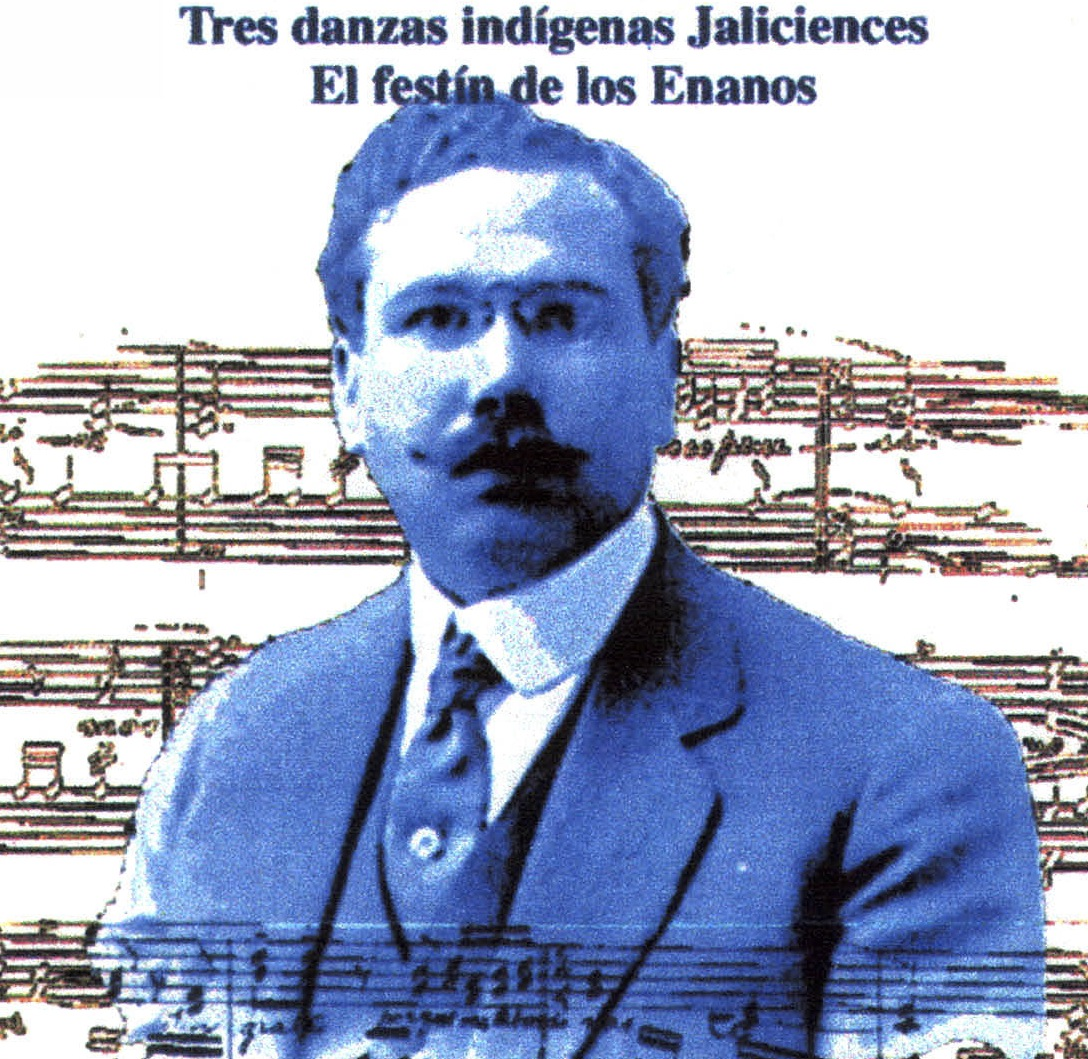
José Rolón

José Rolón (1876–1945) was a Mexican composer, a student of Nadia Boulanger. He established the Orquesta Filarmónica de Jalisco, Jalisco in 1912.
