= Eduardo Hernández Moncada =

Mexican musician

Eduardo Hernández Moncada (September 24, 1899 – December 31, 1995) was a Mexican composer, pianist, and conductor. He is one of the essential musicians representative of the Nationalist Movement of the Post-Revolutionary years in Mexico. His music strives for a balance between modern influence and folk roots. His compositions include orchestral music, opera, ballet and film scores.

== Biography ==
Born in Xalapa, Veracruz, son of a clarinetist. Hernández Moncada started piano lessons at an early age and at 19 moved to Mexico City to enter the National Conservatory. While still in school, he was hired to provide piano accompaniment to silent films playing at a local movie theater. In 1925 he married Teresa de Anda, an opera singer. While working in the movie theater, he met Carlos Chávez, and they began a long friendship. In 1929, Chávez invited Hernández to join the Mexican Symphony Orchestra as pianist, at the same time Silvestre Revueltas became assistant conductor. When Revueltas left the orchestra to form his own National Symphony Orchestra in 1936, Hernández succeeded him as assistant to Chávez. He served as a Director to the Conservatory Choir and Director and Founder of the Opera Academy. He was received an Ariel Award for the score to the movie Deseada (1951). Hernández Moncada was also a teacher and was appointed Principal to the National School of Music. He published several texts including an autobiography and bibliographical sketches of his friends Carlos Chávez and Silvestre Revueltas. He was highly regarded by his peers, including artists like Dimitris Mitropoulos, who conducted his First Symphony.

== Selected works ==
Piano

- Prelude (1926)
- Album of the Heart (1934)
- Costena (1962)

Duos

- Romanza for cello and piano (1949)
- Rhapsody of Sotavento for violin and piano (1974)

Chamber Music

- Suite Romántica (1937)
- Suite of Dances (1939)
- String Quartet (1962)

Orchestra

- Funerary March (1938)
- Symphony Number 1 (1942)
- Symphony Number 2 (1943)
- Guelatao (1957)

Choral Music

- Poems by Omar Khayyám (1932)
- Costena Song (1958)
- Give Me Moon Papyrus (1958)
- Three Sonnets of Sor Juana (1979)

Opera

- Elena (1948)

Ballets

- Endless Voyage (1949)
- Ermesinda (1952)
- Maíz (1952)

Film scores

- Enamorada (1946)
- El Desquite (1947)
- Si me viera Don Porfirio (1950)
- Deseada (1951)
