= Opera in Latin America =

The history of opera in Latin America dates back to at least the early 18th century. Newspaper articles suggest that, around the time that Italian opera was introduced to Latin America, it was received with some disdain due to the language barrier. However, translations in the librettos of certain operas suggest that there was greater interest from Latin Americans than the news had credited. Opera arrived in Latin America as a consequence of European colonization. On October 19, 1701, La púrpura de la rosa premiered in Lima in the Viceroyalty of Peru, the first opera known to be composed and performed in the Americas. It is an opera in one act by Spanish composer Tomás de Torrejón y Velasco with a libretto by Pedro Calderón de la Barca, and is the only surviving opera by Torrejón y Velasco. It tells the myth of the love of Venus and Adonis, which provoked Mars's jealousy and his desire for vengeance. Although the libretto follows the Greek myth, the tragic love story is seen as a resemblance of the alliance that was formed from a political marriage between the Spanish and French monarchies. Opera performances were performed also in the country of Mexico. It is within that nation that the first indigenous opera composers of Latin America emerged, with Manuel de Zumaya (c. 1678–1755) being considered the first and most important early opera composer. Outside of Perú and Mexico, opera was slower to gain a foothold, and it wasn't until the early to mid-19th century that other nations in Latin America began producing their own opera composers. Many of these 19th-century operas focus on the historical conflict between Europeans and indigenous peoples and were influenced by zarzuela, a form of Spanish opera. Mexican zarzuelas, as well as revistas, soon arose from Spanish influence and gained popularity.

In the 20th century many nationalist operas were composed across Latin America, with particularly thriving opera scenes in Mexico, Argentina and Brazil. Today, there are numerous active opera houses throughout Latin America and composers continue to write new operas. We also have organizations such as the International Brazilian Opera Company (IBOC) and Opera Hispanica who are promoting new Latin American operatic repertoire internationally.

== 18th-century opera ==
In 1711, the opera Partenope premiered in Mexico City. Its music was by Manuel de Zumaya, the most important Mexican baroque composer. This opera is particularly important because it was the first opera composed in North America and the first opera composed in the Americas by someone from the Americas.

== 19th-century opera ==
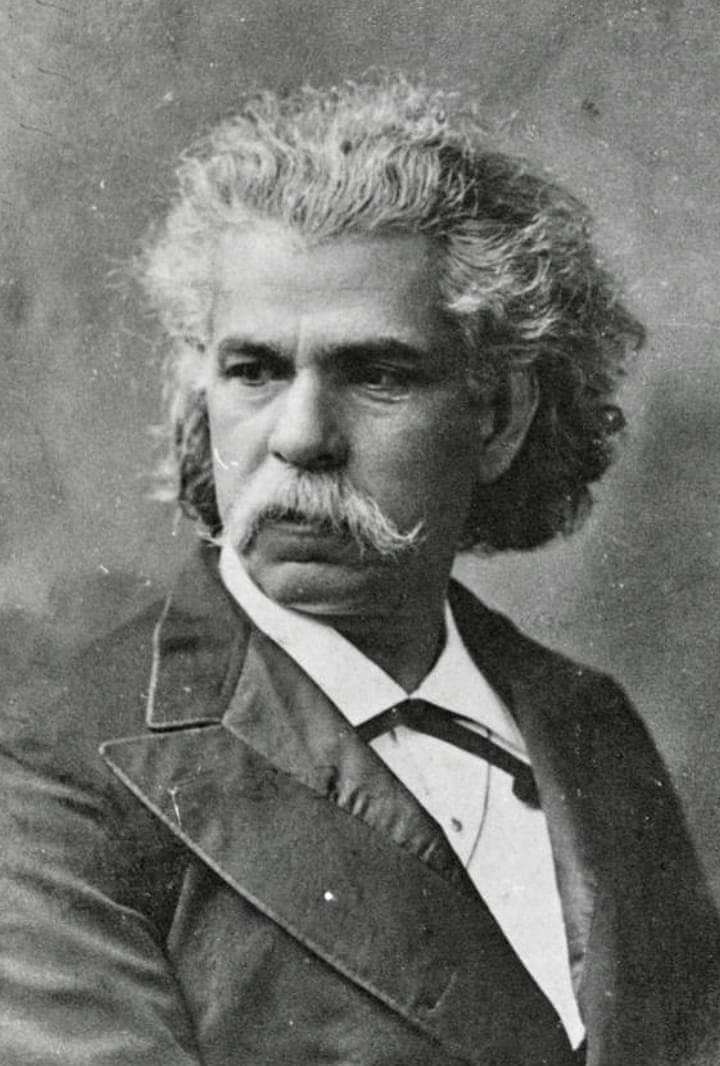
Carlos Gomes in 1893.

The first opera composed and premiered in Brazil was José Maurício Nunes Garcia's I Due Gemelli; the text has since been lost. A Noite de São João may be considered the first truly Brazilian opera, with a text in Portuguese by Elias Álvares Lobo. The most famous Brazilian composer was Carlos Gomes. Many of his operas premiered in Italy, with texts in Italian. However, Gomes often used typically Brazilian themes in his work, such as in his operas Il Guarany and Lo schiavo.

Although Mexico and other countries had already begun producing their own opera, Europe’s opinion of these new operas was regarded as more important than Latin America’s own opinion. Moreover, most performers in Mexico were European, and it took a substantial amount of time before Mexico gained its own control over its own opera companies and performances.

The nineteenth-century opera Guatimotzin by Mexican composer Aniceto Ortega was the first conscious attempt to incorporate pre-Hispanic elements into the formal characteristics of opera. Other important 19th-century Mexican operas are Agorante, rey de la Nubia by Miguel Meneses (premiered during the commemorative festivities for the birthday of Emperor Maximilian I of Mexico), Pirro de Aragón by Leonardo Canales, and Keofar by Felipe Villanueva. The operatic works of Melesio Morales are the most important in Mexico in the 19th century. His operas Romeo y Julieta, Ildegonda, Gino Corsini, and Cleopatra were very successful among the public of Mexico City, and premiered in Europe. The last opera by Melesio Morales, Anita, which was composed in 1908, did not premiere until 2000.

Morales's last period of composition coincided with the creation of operas in Mexico by his son Julio Morales, and the operas of Felipe Villanueva, Ricardo Castro, and Gustavo E. Campa. The work of Ricardo Castro is a part of the tradition of historic, nationalist operas, such as Guatimotzin by Aniceto Ortega, Il Guarany by Antônio Carlos Gomes, Ollanta and Atahualpa by José María Valle Riestra, Huémac by Pascual de Rogatis, and Quiché Vinak by Jesús Castillo. This tradition formed part of a turn-of-the-century operatic movement, in which other important figures included Eliodoro Ortiz de Zárate (Chile), José María Ponce de León (Colombia), Augusto Azzali (Colombia), León Ribeiro (Uruguay), Francisco Hargreaves (Argentina), Miguel Rojas (Argentina), and Edoardo Torrens (Argentina).

The first Venezuelan opera was El maestro Rufo Zapatero, an opera buffa composed by José María Osorio in 1847. (However, many have called Virginia, by José Ángel Montero, the first Venezuelan opera, though it premiered in 1877 under the auspices of the president Antonio Guzmán Blanco) . Earlier, various zarzuelas has been composed, but the first to premiere is believed to be Los alemanes en Italia by José Ángel Montero in the 1860s. Montero also premiered the one-act zarzuelas El Cumpleaños de Leonor, El Charlatán Mudo, La Modista, and many others. Another major Venezuelan composer was Reynaldo Hahn, his operas include Le Merchand de Venise and Ciboulette. Hahn's work was greatly influenced by his teacher Jules Massenet. In zarzuela, another important figure was Pedro Elías Gutiérrez, who incorporated typically Venezuelan rhythms into his work.

Tomás Giribaldi's La Parisina is considered the first Uruguayan opera. It premiered in September 1878. The work was very successful and awakened public interest in operas written by Uruguayan composers. Because of this success, the Uruguayan Oscar Camps y Soler wrote his opera Esmeralda, la gitana, based on the Victor Hugo 1831 novel The Hunchback of Notre-Dame; the opera premiered in Montevideo in 1879. Other Uruguayan composers that wrote opera in this era, motivated by the success of La Parisina, include León Ribeiro and Alfonso Broqua. León Ribeiro premiered his opera Colón in 1892 during the celebration of the 400th anniversary of the discovery of America. Alfonso Broqua wrote one opera, Tabaré, based on the eponymous 1888 poem by José Zorrilla de San Martín.

In the 19th and 20th century, a number of operas were produced in Latin America in which conflict between Europeans and indigenous peoples was a theme. Among the most important operas of this type are Liropeya by León Ribeiro (Uruguay); Guatimotzin by Aniceto Ortega (Mexico); Il Guarany by Antonio Carlos Gomes (1836–1896), based on a novel by the Brazilian José Martiniano de Alencar; Atzimba by Ricardo Castro (Mexico, 1864–1907); the three eponymous operas based on the Tabaré by José Zorrilla de San Martín, written, respectively, by Arturo Cosgaya Ceballos (Mexico, 1869–1937), Heliodoro Oseguera (Mexico), and Alfonso Broqua (Uruguay); Los Martirios de Colon written by Federico Ruiz (Venezuela) and the three Ecuadorian operas based on the novel Cumandá o un drama entre salvajes by Juan León Mera, namely Cumandá by Luis H. Salgado (1903–1977), Cumandá o la virgen de las selvas by Pedro Pablo Traversari Salazar (1874–1956), and Cumandá by Sixto María Durán Cárdenas (1875–1947).

== 20th century and contemporary opera ==
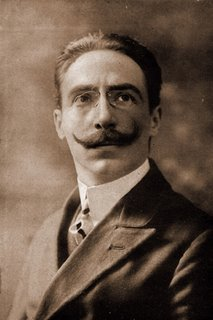
Argentine composer and conductor Ettore Panizza.

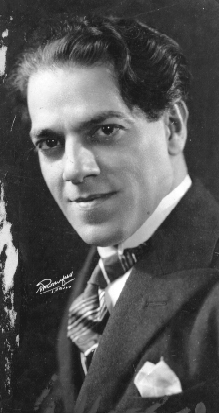
Heitor Villa-Lobos circa 1922

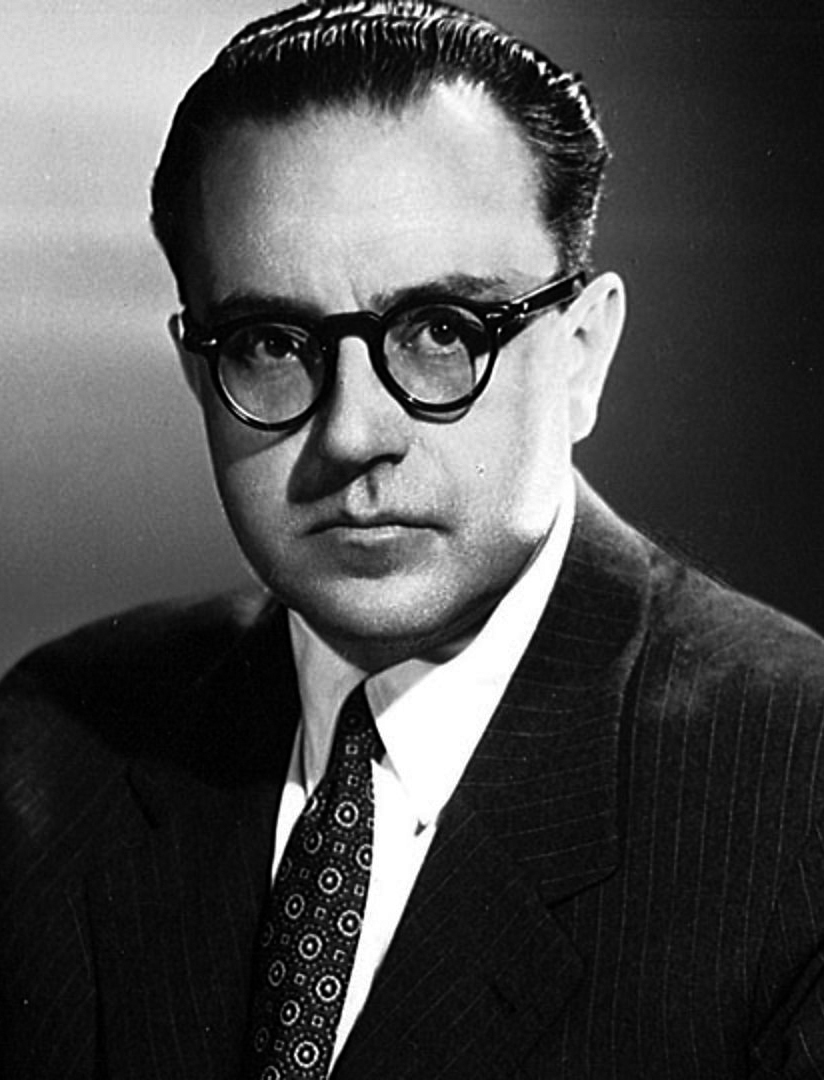
Composer Alberto Ginastera.

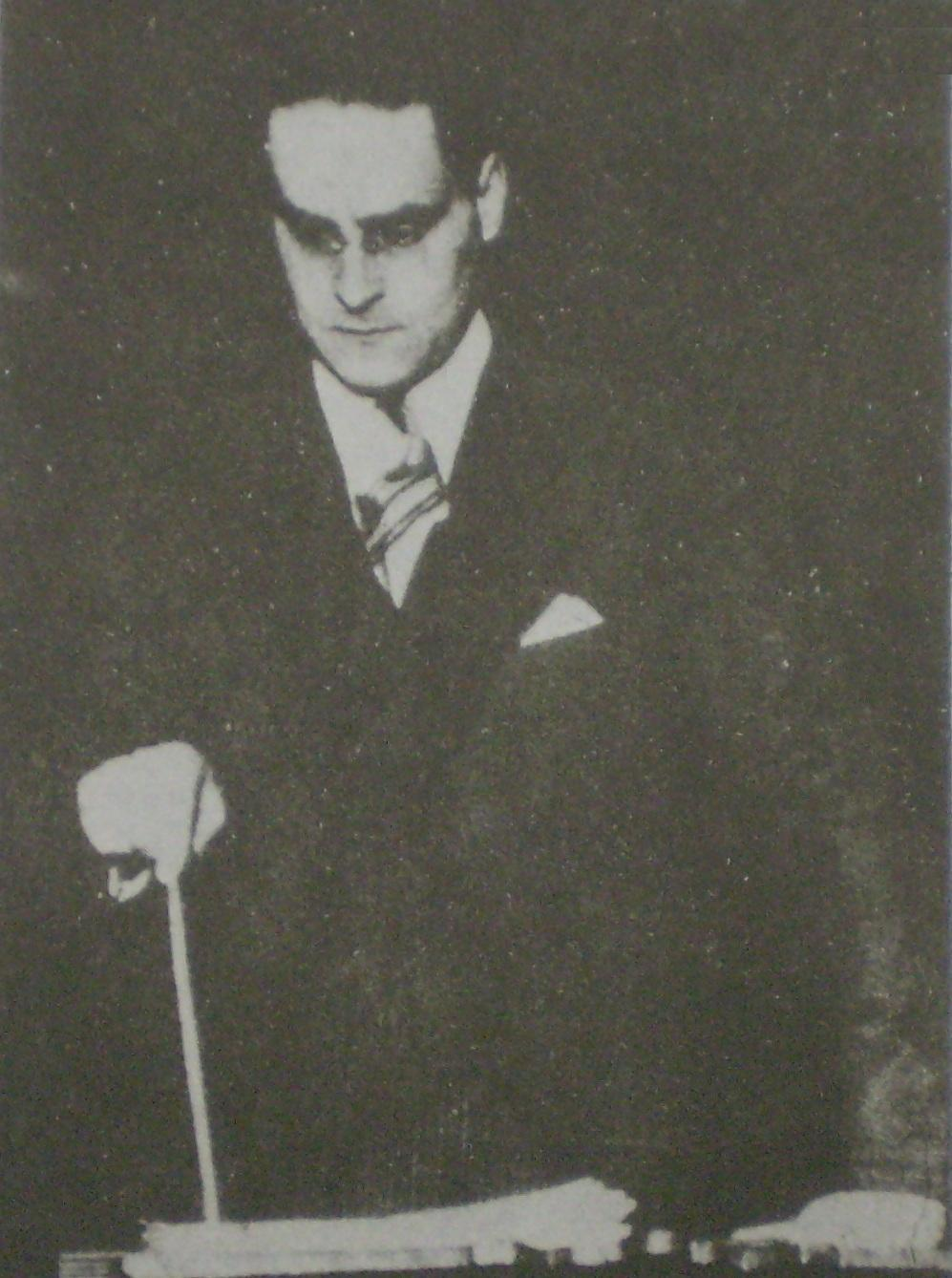
Juan José Castro

Argentina

In Argentina, opera developed with the massive European (mainly Italian) immigration at the beginning of the century and with the opening of the Teatro Colón in 1908 where most of those world premieres took place. The most influential Argentinian opera composers include Ettore Panizza (whose opera Aurora was commissioned for the Colón inaugural season and Bizancio from 1939), Felipe Boero (El Matrero from 1929 his most famous opera, also Tucumán 1918, Ariana y Dyonisos, 1920, Raquela, 1923 and Siripo, 1937), Juan José Castro (composer of Bodas de sangre and La zapatera prodigiosa, both after Federico Garcia Lorca's plays and Proserpina y el extranjero, 1952), Carlos López Buchardo (El sueño de Alma, 1914), Pascual De Rogatis (Huemac, 1916 and La novia del hereje, 1934), Eduardo Garcia Mansilla (La angelical manuelita,1917), Constantino Gaito (Petronio, 1919; Ollantay, 1926, La sangre de las guitarras), 1927, Floro Ugarte (Saika, 1920), Gilardo Gilardi (Ilse, 1923; La leyenda del urutaú, 1934), Athos Palma (Nazdah, 1924), Hector Iglesias Villoud (El Oro del Inca, 1953), Virtú Maragno and Alberto Ginastera composer of Don Rodrigo, Beatrix Cenci and Bomarzo.

In recent years other Argentinean opera composers include Roberto Garcia Morillo (El caso Maillard, 1977) Mario Perusso (La voz del silencio), Claudio Guidi-Drei (Medea, 1973), Juan Carlos Zorzi (Antigona Velez, 1991 and Don Juan, 1993), Pompeyo Camps (La hacienda, 1987, Marathon, 1990 and La oscuridad de la razón, 1996), Gerardo Gandini (La ciudad ausente, 1995 and Liederkreis, 2000), Ástor Piazzolla (Maria de Buenos Aires) and Osvaldo Golijov (Ainadamar'’). In 2006 Centre for Experimentation (CETC) of Teatro Colón, proposed that national poet Rodolfo Enrique Fogwill work with the composer of his choice. He chose Oscar Edelstein who went on to make the script for "Eterna flotación: Los Monstruito’" from two poems of Fogwill, "Contra el Cristal de La Pecera de Acuario" (Against the Glass of the Aquarium) " and "El Antes de los Monstruito" from the book "Lo Dado", to transform them into a continuous discourse that functions as a dramatic text. The opera dealt with the presidency of Menem and the era of decadency, leading to the headline by music critic, Juan Carlos Montero, "The Poetic versus Social Degradation."

Brazil

Important Brazilian opera composers in the first half of the 20th century include Heitor Villa-Lobos, the composer of operas such as Izath, Yerma, and Aglaia; and Camargo Guarnieri, composer of Um Homem Só and Pedro Malazarte. Contemporary Brazilian opera continues these avant-garde tendencies, as is the case with works like Olga by Jorge Antunes, A Tempestade by Ronaldo Miranda, O Cientista by Silvio Barbato, and "Tamanduá (The Anteater) – A Brazilian Opera" by Joao MacDowell, founder of the International Brazilian Opera Company (IBOC), a New York-based non-profit with a mission to create new repertoire based on collaboration of Brazilian and international artists.

Cuba

Opera has been present in Cuba since the latest part of the 18th century.

Ecuador

Recent Ecuadorian operas include Los Enemigos by Mesías Maiguashca, based on the story The Secret Miracle by Jorge Luis Borges; Manuela y Bolívar by Diego Luzuriaga; and the instrumental opera El árbol de los pájaros by Arturo Rodas.

Mexico

In the 1940s, Carlos Chavez was the director of the Instituto Nacional de Bellas Artes (INBA), which was a federal institution to protect and administer the fine arts. Before it was created, Mexican composers were limited in the work they could output, and faced many roadblocks. Chavez, additionally, founded an opera company and academy within the INBA that sought to give the opportunity to aspiring artists to learn, perform, and compose opera in Mexico. Apart from Chavez’s interest in expanding the availability of opera in Mexico, he himself was a skilled composer who integrated aspects of Indianism into his work, infusing traditional Italian opera with Latin American culture. Because of his broad influence, this new style became popular in Mexico from the 1920s to 1950s, despite having been introduced earlier.

Another interesting group is those composers that have tried to develop a Yucatecan operatic tradition based on Mayan legends. These composers typically work in Mérida, Yucatán, and have been scorned by Mexican nationalist historians. These composers include Cosgaya Ceballos, Ríos Escalante, Ricalde Moguel, Rivera Velador, Cárdenas Samada, and Jebe Halfdan. In the first half of the 20th century, composer Julián Carrillo was an important figure in Mexican opera, along with composers similar to him, including Antonio Gomezanda, Juan León Mariscal, Julia Alonso, Sofía Cancino de Cuevas, José F. Vásquez, Arnulfo Miramontes, Rafael J. Tello, Francisco Camacho Vega, and Efraín Pérez Cámara. All of these composers have been relegated by official musical historiography, which only recognizes the work of nationalist composers. Since the end of the 20th century in Mexico (and in all of Latin America), composers are increasingly interested in writing opera. Important Mexican opera composers in the early 21st century include Federico Ibarra, Daniel Catán, Leandro Espinosa, Marcela Rodríguez, Víctor Rasgado, Javier Álvarez, Roberto Bañuelas, Luis Jaime Cortez, Julio Estrada, Gabriela Ortiz, Enrique González Medina, Manuel Henríquez Romero, Leopoldo Novoa, Hilda Paredes, Mario Stern, René Torres, Juan Trigos, Samuel Zyman, Mathias Hinke, Ricardo Zohn-Muldoon, Isaac Bañuelos, Gabriel de Dios Figueroa, Enrique González-Medina, José Carlos Ibáñez Olvera, Víctor Mendoza and Emmanuel Vázquez.

Uruguay

Recent Uruguayan operas include Time and Again Barelas by Miguel del Aguila, a full opera premiered in 2006 commissioned by the city of Albuquerque on its tricentennial celebration. Other operas by Miguel del Aguila include Cuauhtemoc and Composer Missing both premiered in the US.

Venezuela

In contemporary Venezuela, there are great lyrical composers, including María Luisa Escobar, whose works include Kanaime, Orquídeas Azules, and Princesa Girasol. Other important composers include Hector Pellegatti (author of the verismo opera El Negro Miguel with lyrics by Pedro Blanco Vilariño), Alexis Rago (author of El Páramo, Miranda, and Froilán el Infausto), and Federico Ruíz (author of the famous opera buffa Los Martirios de Colón, with a libretto by Aquiles Nazoa). Today, most operatic activity in Venezuela takes place at Teatro Teresa Carreño. Here, operas such as El Páramo by Alexis Rago and Los martirios de Colón by Federico Ruiz have recently premiered.

Other recent premieres include the opera Gertrudis by Gerardo Gerulewicz, with a libretto by Xiomara Moreno, work premiered in concert and in full stage production in Caracas, Venezuela.

Venezuelan-American composer Sylvia Constantinidis who has written both, music and libretto for several lyrical works: two Dramatic Contemporary Operas, Araminta and Afrodita; one Experimental Short Opera, Aurora; and three Children Operas, Lincoln, Ponce de Leon, and The First ThanksGiving. Some scenes from Araminta were premiered in Concert in England 2017. Afrodita, was premiered in concert in England 2015 and in Miami, USA also in 2015. Aurora, the Experimental Short Opera, was premiered in England in 2011. The three Children Operas: Lincoln, Ponce de Leon, and The First ThanksGiving; were all premiered in Florida, USA in 2001, 2002, and 2003. For these three Children Operas, Constantinidis received the "Educator of Note Award 2003" by the “Ethel and W. George Kennedy Family Foundation”, and the Young Patronesses of the Opera, the Florida Grand Opera. In 2024 Ángel Hernández Lovera premiered the ópera Alice conducted by Elisa Vega.

Perú

In November 2012 chamber operas "Secreto", "La Cena", "Post Mortem", "María Fernanda se reb(v)ela" and "Sacrificio" by composers Clara Petrozzi, Gonzalo Garrido Lecca, Sadiel Cuentas, Rafael Leonardo Junchaya and Alvaro Zúñiga were premiered in the French Alliance Theatre. All five operas had librettos by Maritza Núñez. In December 2012 Nilo Velarde's opera "Akas Kas", with libretto by Celeste Viale and commissioned by Perú's Culture Ministry, was premiered in Peru's Grand National Theater by Peru's National Orchestra, National Ballet, National Folklore Ensamble, National Chorus and National Children Chorus. In October 2013 Nilo Velarde's Opera "La Ciudad Bajo el Mar", with libretto by Maritza Núñez, was premiered in Perú's Grand National Theatre by the National Children Chorus. In December 2015 Jimmy Lopez's "Bel Canto", with libretto by Nilo Cruz and commissioned by the Lyric Opera of Chicago, was premiered in Ardis Krainik Theatre of the Civic Opera House, Chicago. In May 2016 Alvaro Zuñiga's "Ger Mania", with libretto by Maritza Núñez, was premiered in Helsinki, Finland.

== See also ==
- List of Mexican operas
- List of Argentine operas
- List of Latin American and South American opera companies

== Sources ==
- Grout, Donald Jay and Williams, Hermine Weigel (2003). A short history of opera, Columbia University Press. ISBN 0231119585
