= List of Mexican operas =

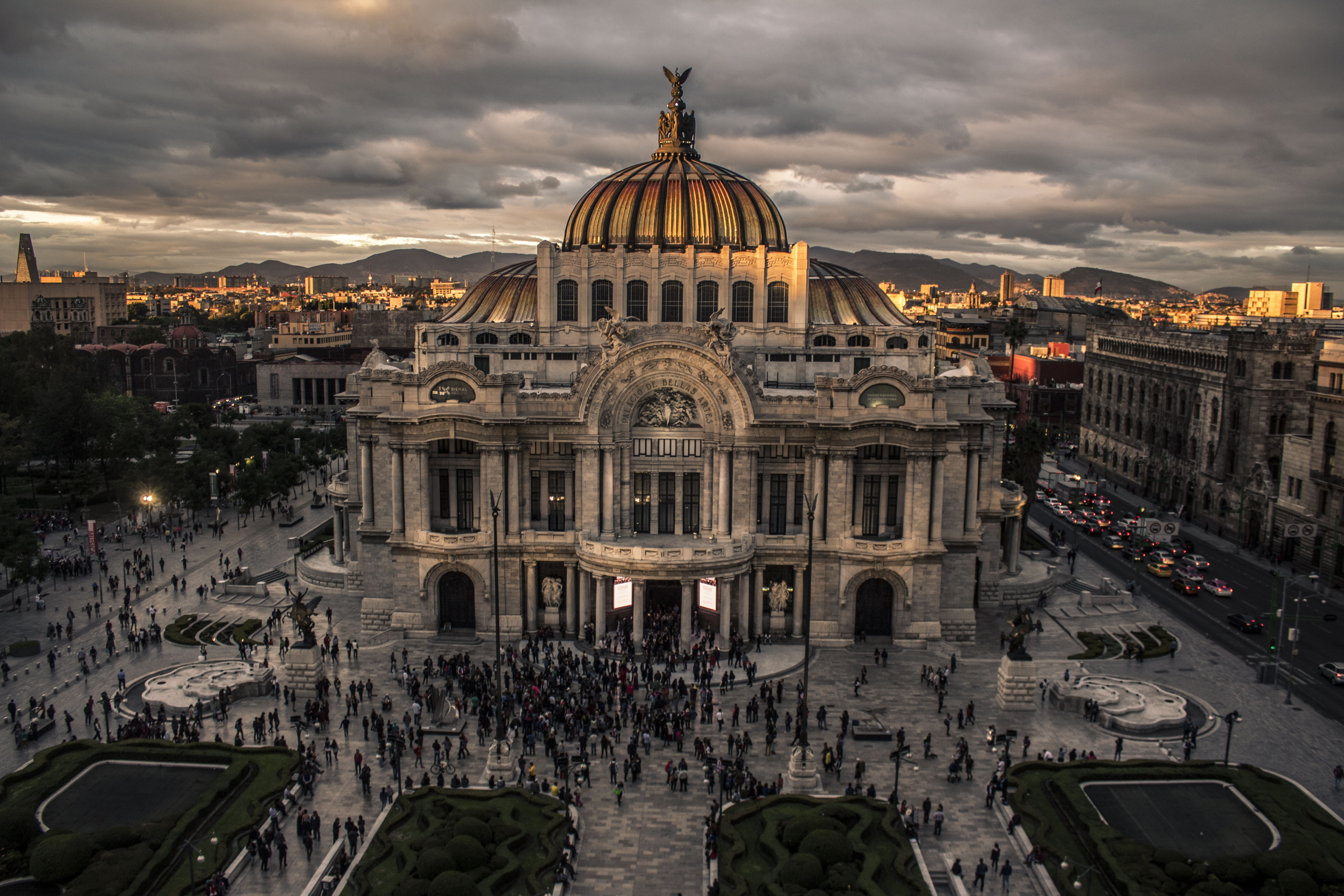
The Palacio de Bellas Artes in Mexico City where several operas by Mexican composers had their world premieres.

This is a list of operas by Mexican composers. Many, but not all, of them premiered in Mexico. Amongst the operas which had their first performances abroad are Melesio Morales' Ildegonda (Italy, 1868), Daniel Catán's Florencia en el Amazonas (USA, 1996), and Julio Estrada's Murmullos del páramo (Spain, 2006).

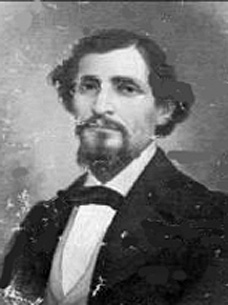
Cenobio Paniagua, the composer of the first Mexican opera seria.

Mexico boasts several professional opera companies, including the National Opera Company (Compañía Nacional de Ópera) and the Opera de Bellas Artes, both based in Mexico City. The International Cervantino Festival in Guanajuato, for example, features opera performances alongside theater, dance, and music. In addition to the Palacio de Bellas Artes, Mexico is home to other notable opera houses, such as the Teatro Degollado in Guadalajara and the Teatro de la Ciudad Esperanza Iris in Mexico City.

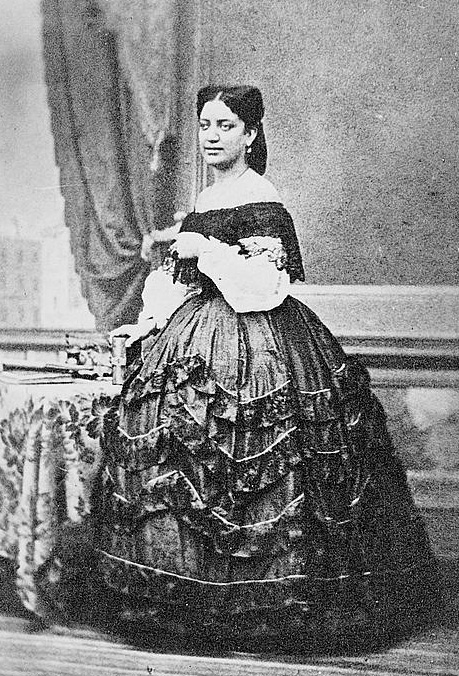
Ángela Peralta, known in Europe as "The Mexican Nightingale", who sang in the premieres of operas by Paniagua, Morales, and Ortega del Villar.

Many of the operas listed have librettos in Spanish, the official language of Mexico. However, the practice of using French or Italian librettos was common in 19th and early 20th century Mexico when much of the opera in that country was performed by visiting troupes largely composed of European singers unaccustomed to singing in Spanish. Both Gustavo Campa's Le roi poete and Ricardo Castro Herrera's La légende de Rudel had French librettos, while Catalina de Guisa by Cenobio Paniagua and several other notable operas of this period had Italian librettos. Although the vast majority of later Mexican operas have Spanish librettos, there have been 20th century works set to English texts, most notably The visitors by Carlos Chávez with a libretto by the American poet Chester Kallman.

Opera was brought to Mexico during the colonial era by Spanish missionaries and settlers. The first documented opera performance in Mexico took place in 1701 in Mexico City. The first opera by a Mexican-born composer was Manuel de Zumaya's La Parténope, performed in 1711 before a private audience in the Viceroy's Palace in Mexico City. However, the first Mexican composer to have his operas publicly staged was Manuel Arenzana, the maestro de capilla at Puebla Cathedral from 1792 to 1821. He is known to have written at least two works performed during the 1805/1806 season at the Teatro Coliseo in Mexico City – El extrangero and Los dos ribales en amore. Both were short comic pieces. The first Mexican opera seria was Paniagua's Catalina de Guisa (composed in 1845 and premiered in 1859).

With its story about the Huguenots in France and an Italian libretto by Felice Romani, contemporary critics noted that the only thing Mexican about it was the composer. Although the traditions of European opera and especially Italian opera had initially dominated the Mexican music conservatories and strongly influenced native opera composers (in both style and subject matter), elements of Mexican nationalism had already appeared by the latter part of the 19th century with operas such as Aniceto Ortega del Villar's 1871 Guatimotzin, a romanticised account of the defense of Mexico by its last Aztec ruler, Cuauhtémoc. Later works such as Miguel Bernal Jiménez's 1941 Tata Vasco (based on the life of Vasco de Quiroga, the first bishop of Michoacán) incorporated native melodies into the score.

== List ==
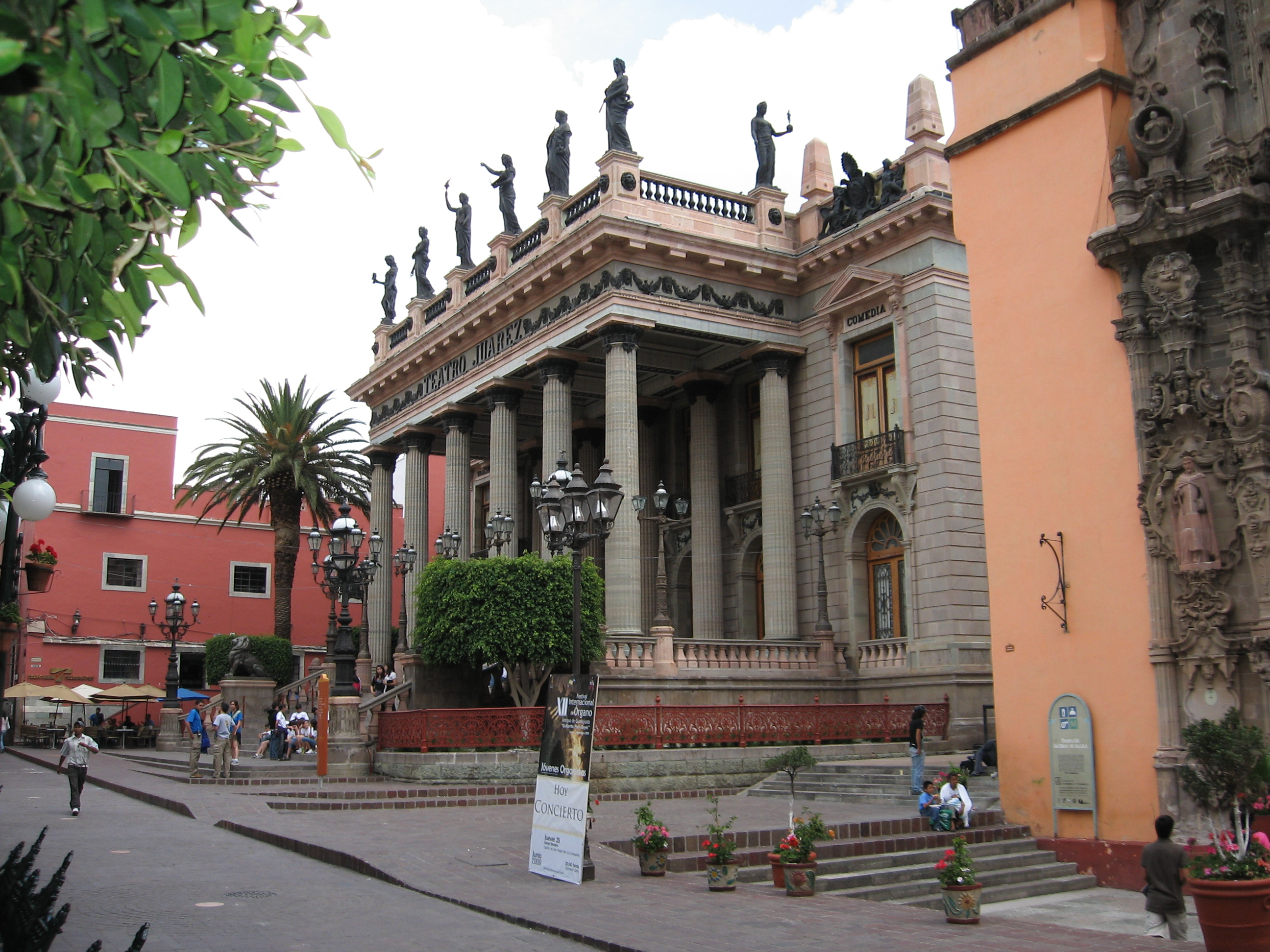
The Teatro Juárez in Guanajuato, where the final version Chávez's The visitors premiered in 1999.

=== 18th century ===
- La Parténope by Manuel de Sumaya – premiered 1711, Viceregal Palace, Mexico City (music lost)

=== 19th century ===
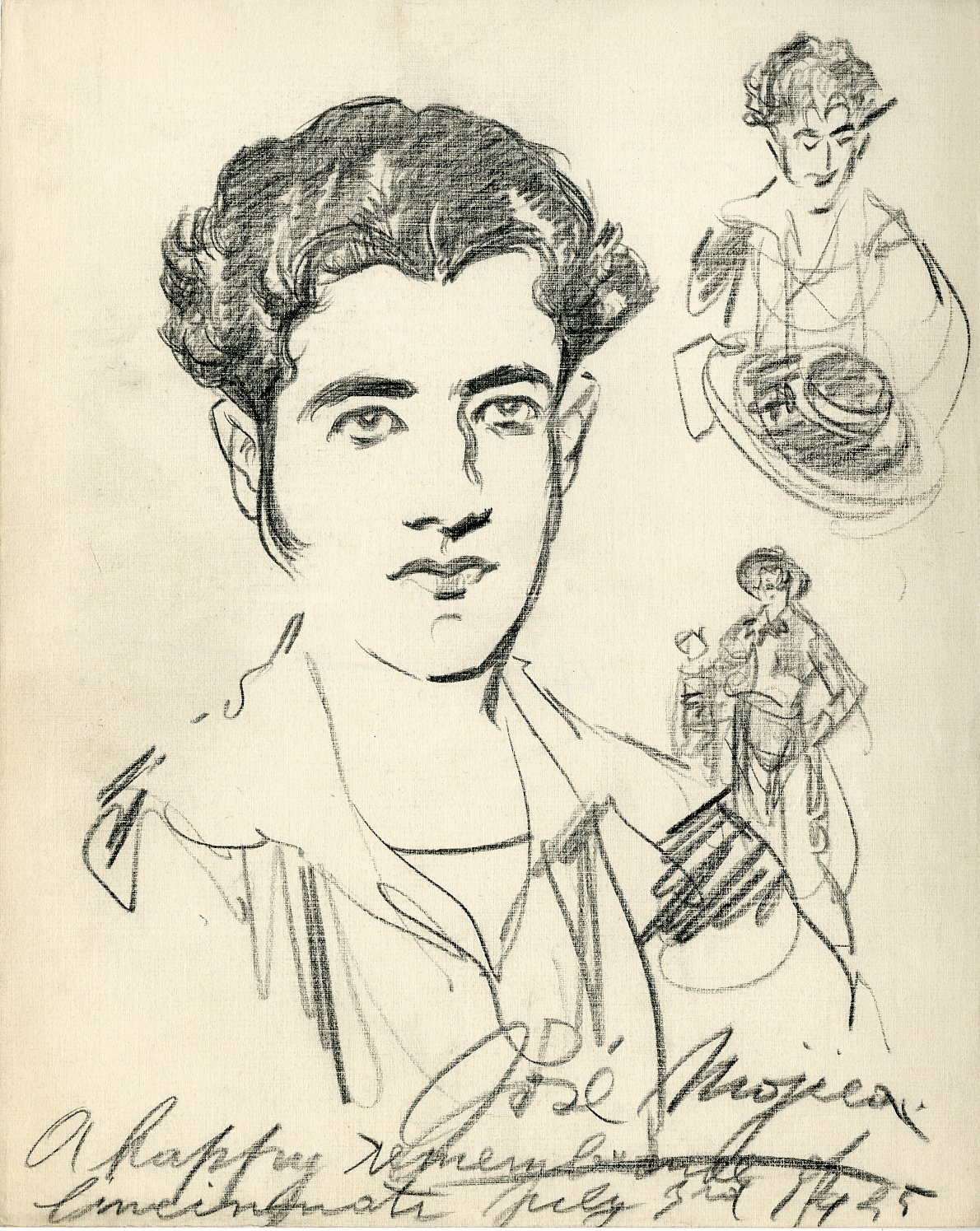
Jose Mojica signed drawing by Manuel Rosenberg while performing in Cincinnati, Ohio 1925.

- El extrangero by Manuel Arenzana – premiered 1805/1806 season, Teatro Coliseo, Mexico City (music and libretto lost)
- Los dos ribales en amore by Manuel Arenzana – premiered 1805/1806 season, Teatro Coliseo, Mexico City (music and libretto lost)
- Leonor by Luis Baca (1826–1855) – never staged
- Giovanna di Castiglia by Luis Baca – never staged
- Catalina de Guisa by Cenobio Paniagua (1821–1882) – premiered 1859, Gran Teatro Nacional, Mexico City
- Pietro d’Abano by Cenobio Paniagua – premiered 1863, Gran Teatro Nacional, Mexico City
- Ildegonda by Melesio Morales – premiered 1868, Teatro Pagliano, Florence
- Guatimotzin by Aniceto Ortega del Villar (1823–1875) – premiered 1871, Gran Teatro Nacional, Mexico City
- Juno by Rafael J. Tello (1872–1947) – premiered 1896, Mexico City

=== 20th century ===
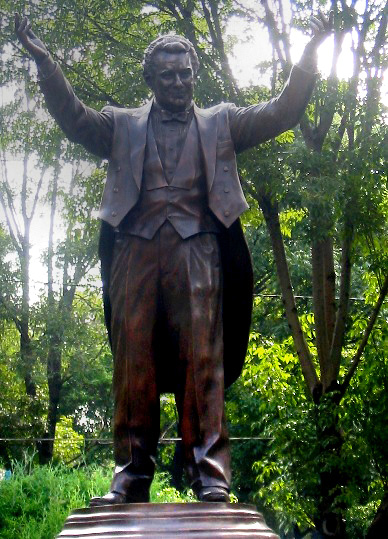
A statue in Mexico City to Plácido Domingo as a recognition to his contributions to 1985 Mexico City earthquake victims and his artistic works.

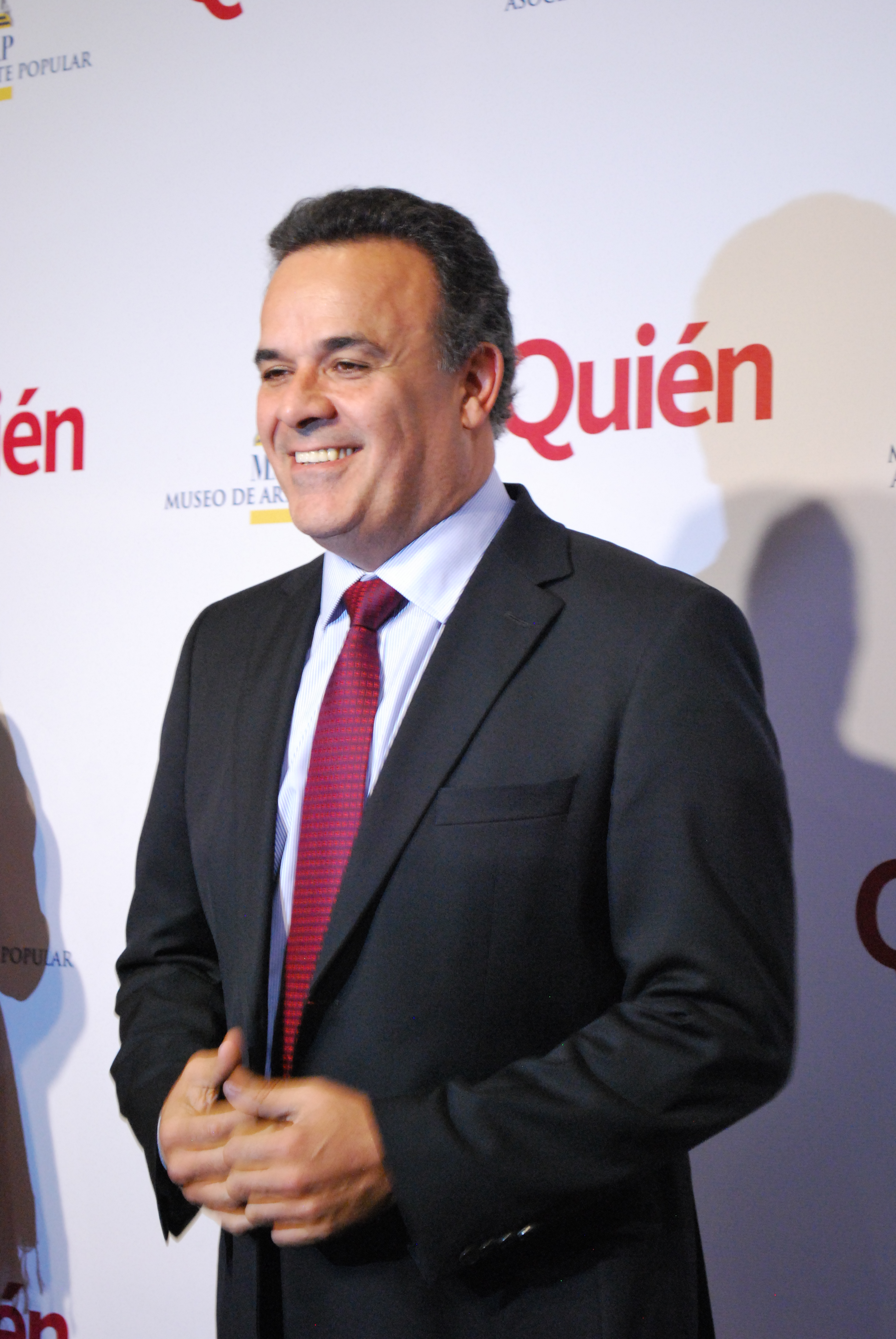
Fernando de la Mora

- Atzimba by Ricardo Castro Herrera (1864–1907) – premiered 1900, Teatro Renacimiento, Mexico City)
- Le roi poete by Gustavo E. Campa (1863–1934) – premiered 1901, Teatro Principal, Mexico City
- La légende de Rudel by Ricardo Castro Herrera – premiered 1906, Teatro Arbeu, Mexico City
- Tata Vasco by Miguel Bernal Jiménez – premiered 1941, Pátzcuaro, Mexico
- La mulata de Córdoba by José Pablo Moncayo – premiered 1948, Palacio de Bellas Artes, Mexico City)
- La encrucijada by Manuel Enríquez (unfinished opera in one act to a libretto by Guillermo Schmidhuber, composed sometime after 1949)
- The Visitors by Carlos Chávez – premiered incomplete 1957 as Panfilo and Lauretta, Brander Matthews Theatre, New York City; premiered in final version 1999, Teatro Juárez, Guanajuato, Mexico
- El romance de Doña Balada by Alicia Urreta – premiered 1974, Centro Cultural El Ágora, Villahermosa, Mexico
- La mujer y su sombra by Miguel Alcázar – premiered 1981, Palacio de Bellas Artes, Mexico City
- Leoncio y Lena by Federico Ibarra – premiered 1981, Teatro Juan Ruiz de Alarcón, Mexico City
- La Güera by Carlos Jiménez Mabarak 1982, Palacio de Bellas Artes, Mexico City
- Orestes parte by Federico Ibarra – premiered 1984, Sala Nezahualcóyotl, Mexico City
- Aura by Mario Lavista – premiered 1988, Palacio de Bellas Artes, Mexico City
- El Pequeño Principe by Federico Ibarra – premiered 1988, California State University, Los Angeles, California
- Ambrosio o la fábula del amor by José Antonio Guzmán – premiered 1990, Sala Miguel Covarrubias, Mexico City
- La hija de Rapaccini by Daniel Catán – premiered 1991, Palacio de Bellas Artes, Mexico City
- La sunamita by Marcela Rodríguez – premiered 1991, Teatro de la Ciudad, Mexico City
- Madre Juana by Federico Ibarra – premiered 1993, Teatro Juan Ruiz de Alarcón, Mexico City
- The Seventh Seed by Hilda Paredes – premiered 1993 (in concert version), UNAM, Mexico City
- Despertar al Sueño by Federico Ibarra – premiered 1994, Centro Cultural San Ángel, Mexico City
- Anacleto Morones by Victor Rasgado – premiered 1994, Teatro Lirico Sperimentale "A. Belli", Spoleto, Italy
- Alicia by Federico Ibarra – premiered 1995 (complete version), Palacio de Bellas Artes, Mexico City
- Florencia en el Amazonas by Daniel Catán – premiered 1996, Houston Grand Opera, Houston, Texas
- La tentación de San Antonio by Luis Jaime Cortez – premiered 1998, Palacio de Bellas Artes, Mexico City
- DeCachetitoRaspado by Juan Trigos – chamber version premiered 1999, Teatro Helénico, Mexico City

=== 21st century ===
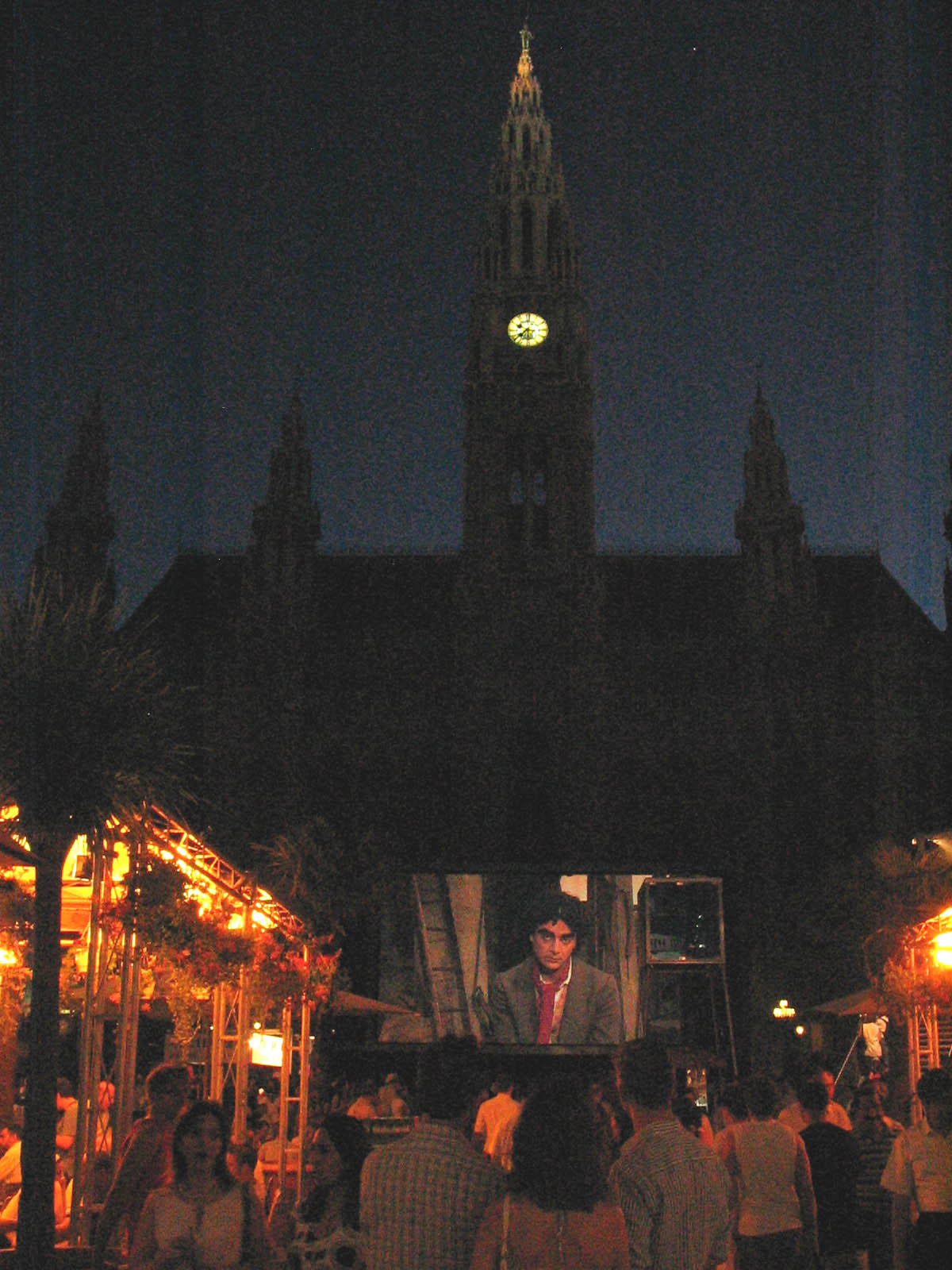
Rolando Villazón in the L'elisir d'amore in Vienna 2007.

- Serafina y Arcángela by José Enrique González Medina – premiered 2001, State Playhouse, Cal State LA (USA)
- TRILOGY Mis Dos Cabezas Piensan Peor Que Una (My Two Heads Thinks Worse Than One) by Juan Trigos – premiered 2005, Lisinski Hall, Zagreb (Croatia)

- Briago crucificado
- Historia de cabeza
- Ni una gota de conciencia

- Murmullos del páramo by Julio Estrada – premiered 2006, El Teatro Español, Madrid
- El juego de los insectos (Spanish Wikipedia article) by Federico Ibarra – premiered 2009, Palacio de Bellas Artes, Mexico City
- Antonieta, un ángel caído, by Federico Ibarra Groth, libretto by Verónica Musalem, based on the life of Antonieta Rivas Mercado – premiered 2010 during CENIDIM's International Conference for Musicology, Mexico City
- Únicamente la verdad, by Gabriela Ortiz, libretto by Ruben Ortiz, – premiered 2010 Indiana University Jacobs School of Music in Indiana University at the Buskirk-Chumley Theater
- Illegal Alien/Inmigrante Ilegal, by Alfonso Molina, libretto by Alfonso Molina, – premiered 2014 University of Arizona Fred Fox School of Music in the University of Arizona at the Crowder Hall Theater
- Arsenikblüten, by Diana Syrse, libretto by Daniélle Sarréra – premiered 2014 Sankt Lukas Kirche. München, Germany.
- Marea Roja, by Diana Syrse, libretto by Alejandro Román Bahena, – premiered 2016 Centro Nacional de las Artes in Mexico City
- Cómo aprendió Nanita a hacer flan by José Enrique González Medina – premiered 2017, Teatro de las Artes, Cenart, Ciudad de México. Commissioned by Cincinnati Opera Education.
- Luciérnaga, by Gabriela Ortiz, libretto by Silvia Peláez, premiered in 2018, Sala Miguel Covarrubias, UNAM. Commissioned for the 50th Anniversary of 1968 Students Movement in Mexico.

== See also ==
- Music of Mexico
- Opera in Latin America
- Operas set in Mexico
