= Tabaré =

Tabaré may refer to:

- Tabaré (poem), an 1888 epic poem by Juan Zorrilla de San Martín
- Tabaré (given name), including a list of people with the name
- Tabare Rural LLG, Papua New Guinea
- Tabaré (opera by Alfonso Broqua), an opera in Latin America
- Tabaré (opera by Arturo Cosgaya Ceballos), an opera in Latin America
- Tabaré (opera by Heliodoro Oseguera), an opera in Latin America
- Tabaré (opera by Tomás Bretón), an opera by Tomás Bretón
