= Gran Teatro Nacional (Mexico) =

Former opera house in Mexico City

The Great National Theatre of Mexico was a large opera house in Mexico City.

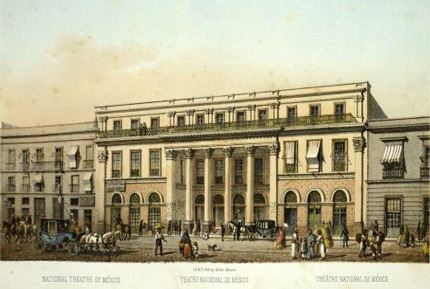
Great National Theatre

== Milestones in its history ==
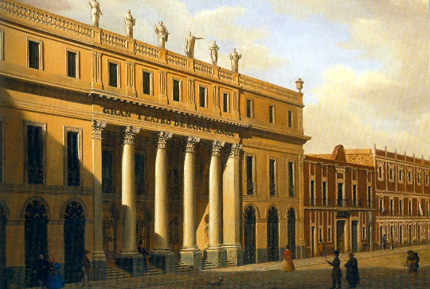
The Gran Teatro Nacional in Mexico City; painting by Pedro Gualdi

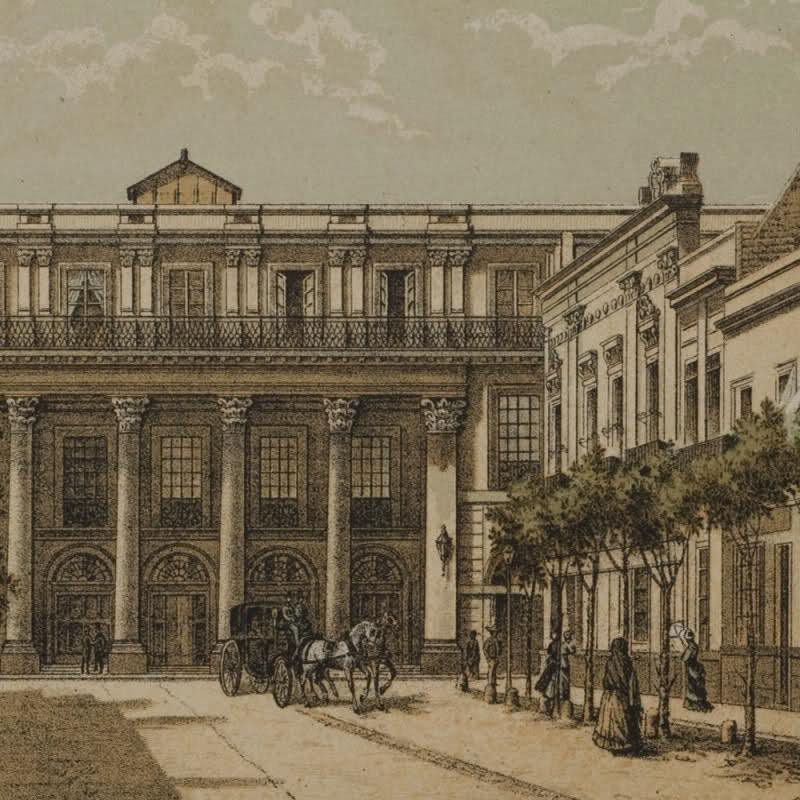
19th-century engraving depicting the great National Theatre of Mexico.

The theatre was built between 1840 and 1844 by architect Lorenzo de la Hidalga in Mexico City. It was located at the end of Cinco de Mayo Ave., on Vergara Street (now Bolívar). It had a capacity of more than 3,500 people; that is to say, 1,500 more seats than the present-day Palacio de Bellas Artes.

Historians consider it the most important architectural work in Mexico City between the completion of the Metropolitan Cathedral and the building of the Palacio de Bellas Artes. The Great National Theatre was inaugurated in one of Antonio López de Santa Anna's terms as president. Its name changed successively, from Great Theatre of Santa Anna to Great Theatre Vergara, then Great Imperial Theatre, and finally Great National Theatre.

During the opera season of 1852, the theatre premiered 17 operas and offered more than 60 performances.

=== Great Imperial Theatre ===
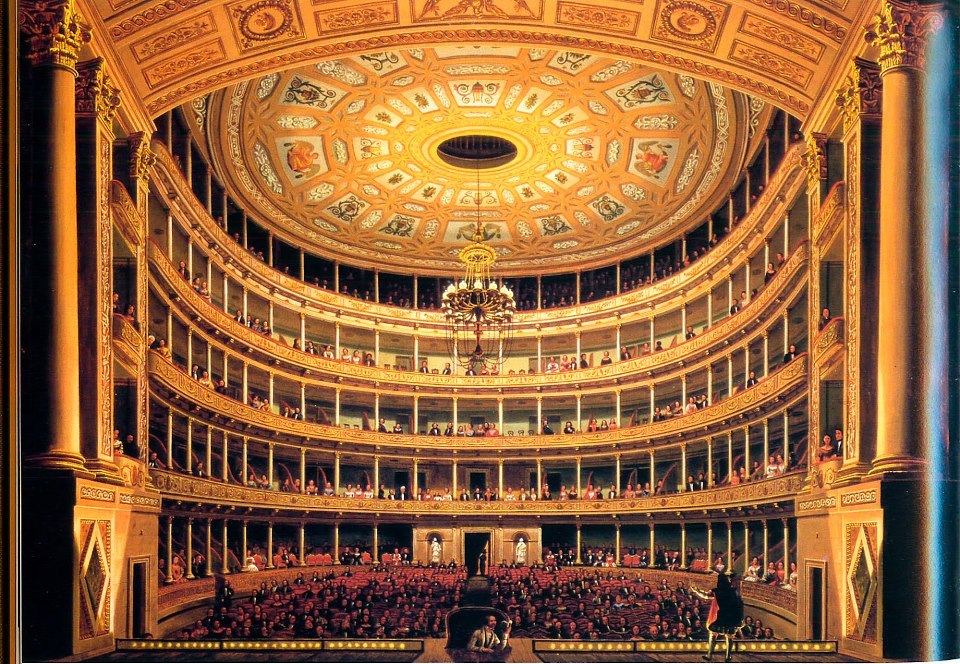
Pedro Gualdi: Interior of the Great Theatre of Santa Anna (later Great National Theatre of Mexico). 19th century.

During the Second Mexican Empire, by command of emperor Maximilian I of Mexico, the theatre changed its name to Great Imperial Theatre. During this period it was directed by Spanish playwright José Zorrilla.

In this period a scandal occurred relating to the opera Ildegonda by Melesio Morales, which premiered on 27 January 1866. When the opera was ready, a group of notables, including Don José Urbano Fonseca and Don José Ignacio Durán, went to see the impresario of the Great Imperial Theatre, Don Annibale Biacchi, so that Morales's opera could premiere there. Biacchi answered that he would not stage a work by a Mexican, which would damage his business.

=== Great National Theatre ===
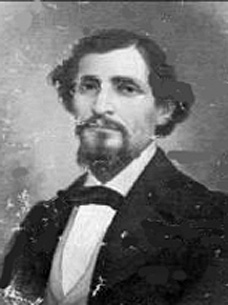
The composer, Cenobio Paniagua (1821-1882)

After the death of the emperor Maximilian I of Mexico and the restoration of the Republic, the theatre was renamed Great National Theatre.

Around this time was the worldwide première of Cleopatra by Melesio Morales, writes Mañón:

=== Demolition ===
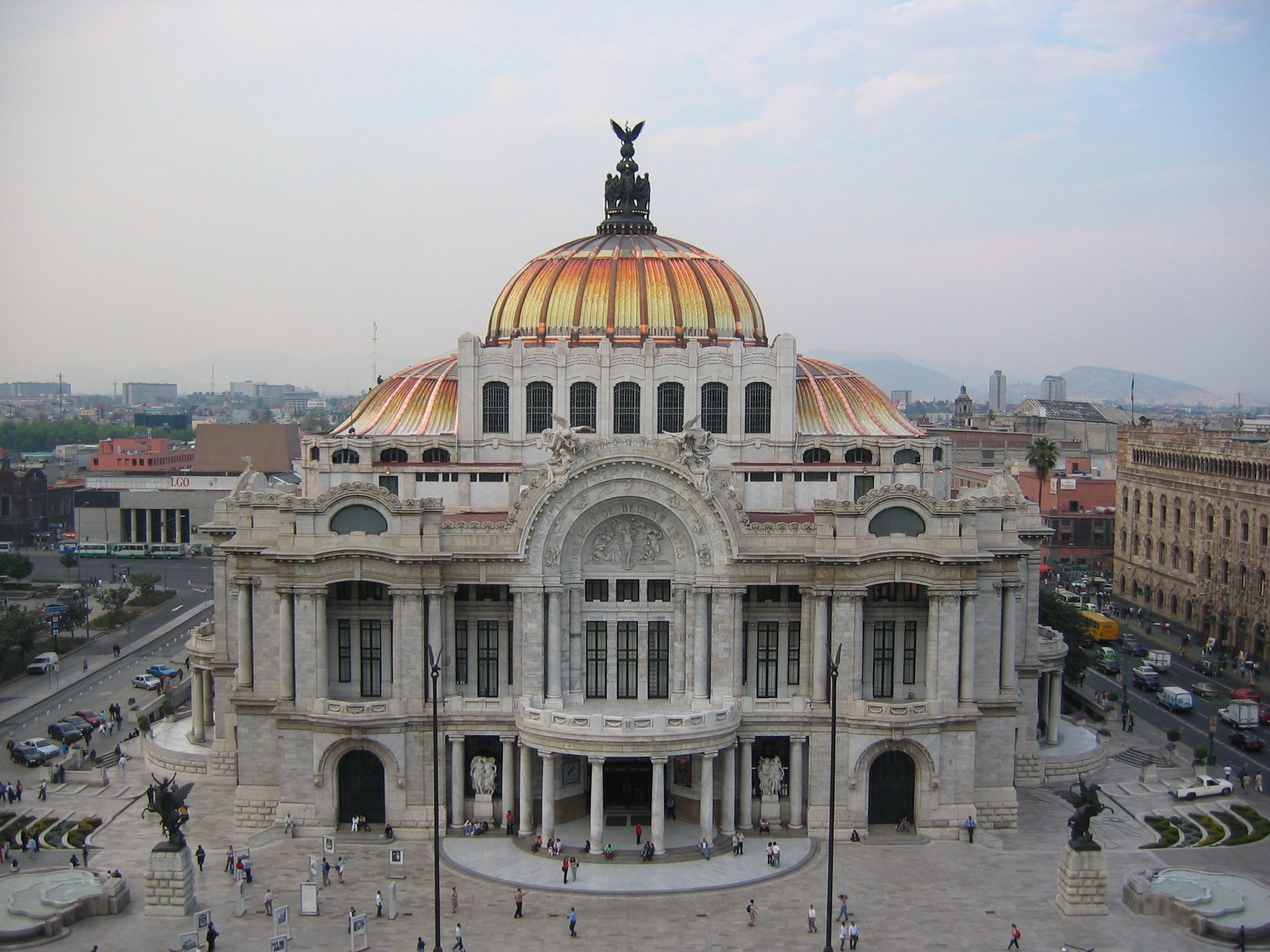
The Great National Theatre would be replaced by the Palacio de Bellas Artes in 1904, but this did not happen until 1934.

The Great National Theatre was demolished between 1900 and 1901 to extend the Avenida Cinco de Mayo. The demolition was justified with the promise that the theatre would be replaced by the Palacio de Bellas Artes, whose construction began in 1904, but was interrupted by the Mexican Revolution, and finally opened in 1934. In the more than 30 years between the demolition of the old theatre and the inauguration of the Palacio de Bellas Artes, opera performances took place at the Teatro Principal and the Teatro Arbeu. Of all these theatres the plans have been restored, and they could be rebuilt.

== Worldwide premières at the Great National Theatre of Mexico ==
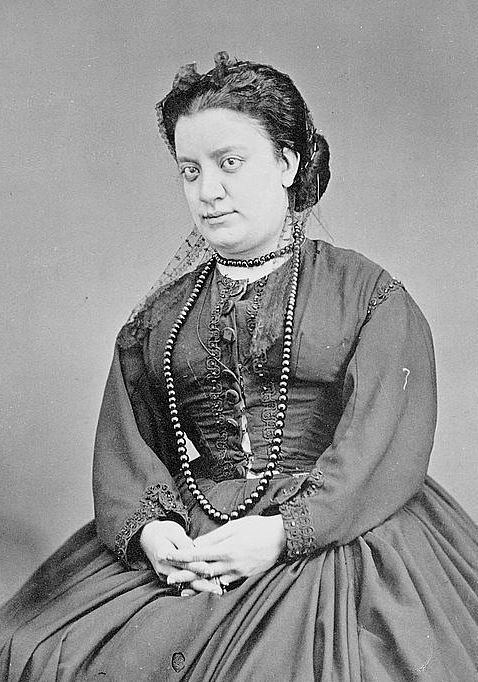
Ángela Peralta, a talented soprano who regularly performed at the Great National Theatre.

- 1859: Catalina de Guisa, three-act opera by Cenobio Paniagua.
- 1863: Romeo y Julieta, opera by Melesio Morales.
- 1864: Agorante, rey de la Nubia, opera by Miguel Meneses.
- 1866 (27 January): Ildegonda, three-act opera by Melesio Morales.
- 1871 (9 February): Don Quijote en la venta encantada, libretto by A. Garcìa and music by Miguel Planas.
- 1871 (13 September): Guatimozin, one-act opera by Aniceto Ortega de Villar, with tenor Enrico Tamberlick and soprano Ángela Peralta.
- 1877: Gino Corsini, four-act opera by Melesio Morales.
- 1891: Cleopatra, four-act opera by Melesio Morales.

== Bibliography ==
- Contenido magazine, March 2009, "Crónicas de la Ciudad: Así era el Gran Teatro Nacional", by Alberto Barranco Chavarría.
- Manuel Mañón: "Historia del viejo Gran Teatro Nacional de México, 1841-1901. Mexico, CONACULTA, 2010.
