= Ángela Peralta =

Mexican operatic soprano (1845–1883)

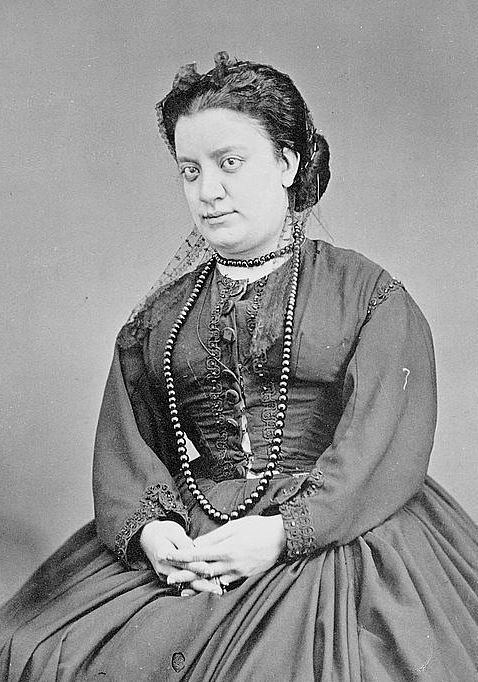
- Ángela Peralta Castera
- Born: María de los Ángeles Manuela Tranquilina Cirila Efrena Peralta Castera; 6 July 1845; Mexico City, Mexico
- Died: 30 August 1883 (aged 38); Mazatlán, Sinaloa, Mexico
- Occupations: Operatic soprano, composer, pianist, harpist
- Years active: 1860s–1883
- Known for: Leading 19th-century Mexican operatic soprano, "Mexican Nightingale"
- Notable work: Álbum Musical de Ángela Peralta
- Spouse(s): Eugenio Castera (m. date unknown; separated)
- Partner: Julián Montiel y Duarte (m. 1883; deathbed marriage)

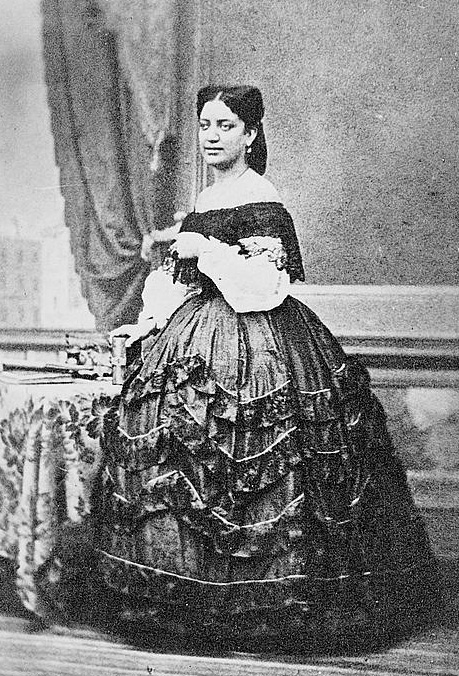
Ángela Peralta circa 1875

Ángela Peralta (6 July 1845, Mexico City – 30 August 1883, Mazatlán) (baptised María de los Ángeles Manuela Tranquilina Cirila Efrena Peralta Castera) was an operatic soprano of international fame and a leading figure in the operatic life of 19th-century Mexico. Called the "Mexican Nightingale" in Europe, she had already sung to acclaim in major European opera houses by the age of 20. Although primarily known for her singing, she was also a composer as well as an accomplished pianist and harpist.

== Biography ==
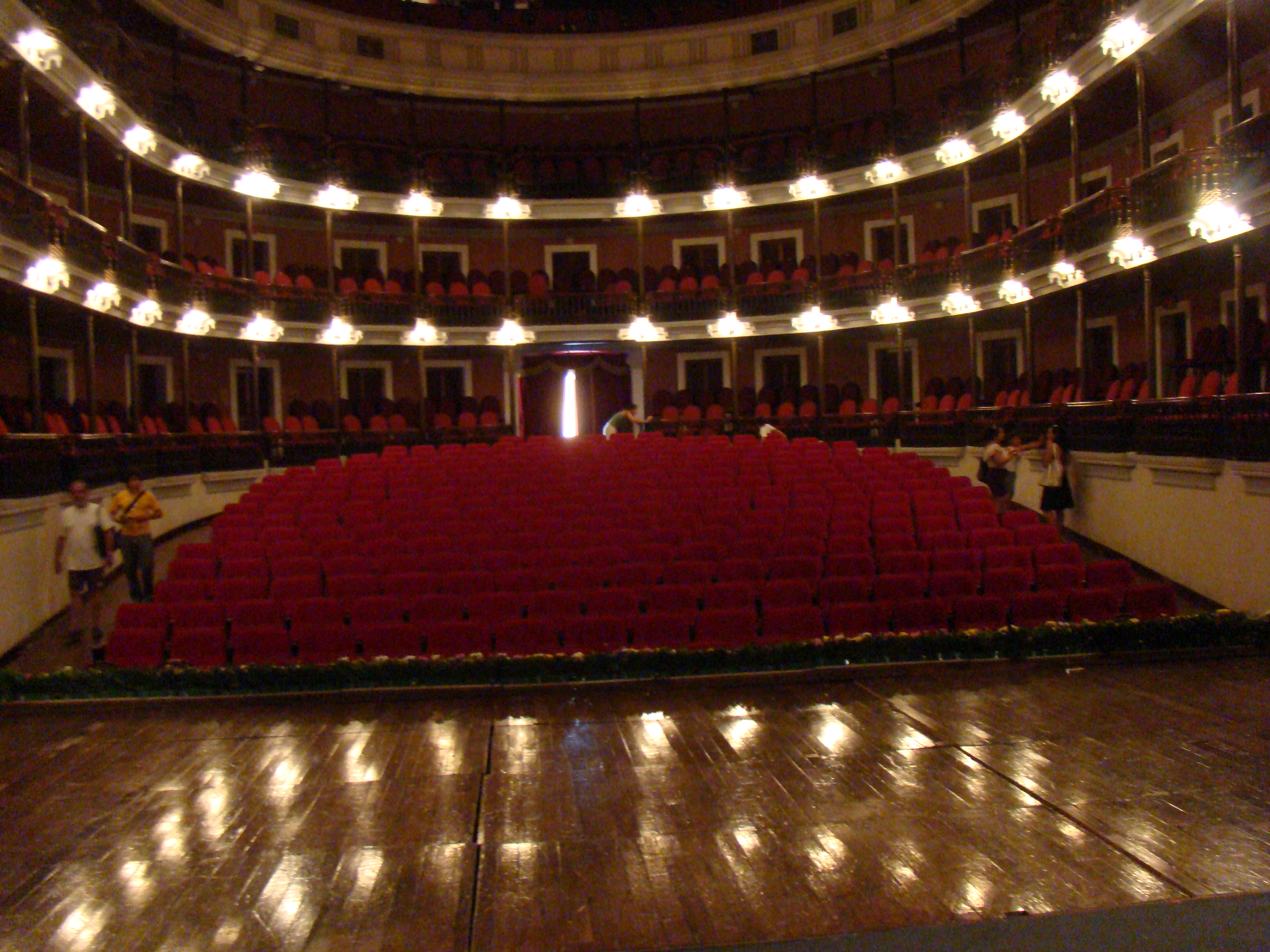
Proscenium and stall of the Ángela Peralta Theater in Mazatlán

Ángela Peralta was the daughter of Manuel Peralta and Josefa Castera de Peralta. She showed an early talent for singing and music. At the age of 8, she sang a cavatina from Belisario by Gaetano Donizetti with great success, and went on to study at the Conservatorio Nacional de Música in Mexico City. At 15 she made her operatic debut as Leonora in Giuseppe Verdi's Il trovatore at the Teatro Nacional in Mexico City. Accompanied by her father, and financed by a wealthy patron, Santiago de la Vega, she then went on to study singing in Italy under Leopardi. On 13 May 1862, she made her debut at La Scala in Milan with an acclaimed performance of Donizetti's Lucia di Lammermoor.

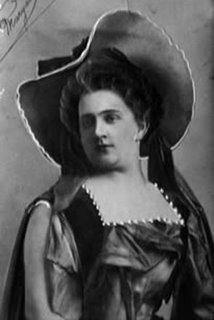
Ángela Peralta Casteia

She sang Bellini's La sonnambula before King Victor Emmanuel II of Italy at the Teatro Regio in Turin where she received 32 curtain calls. Between 1863 and 1864, she sang in the opera houses of Rome, Florence, Bologna, Genoa, Naples, Lisbon, Madrid, Barcelona, Saint Petersburg, Alexandria, and Cairo. The Second Mexican Empire invited her to return to her country to sing in the National Imperial Theatre, and in 1865 she accepted the invitation. In 1866 she sang before Maximilian I of Mexico and Charlotte of Belgium and was named "Chamber singer of the Empire". In December 1866, with the downfall of the Second Mexican Empire imminent, she returned to Europe, performing in New York City and Havana along the way. In Madrid, she married her cousin, Eugenio Castera, and for a while retired from singing, although she continued to compose songs and piano pieces. Her most well-known work is Álbum Musical de Ángela Peralta. Her marriage was an unhappy one, due to her husband's mental illness, which manifested itself in the first year of their marriage. He was later committed to a mental hospital in Paris where he died in 1876.

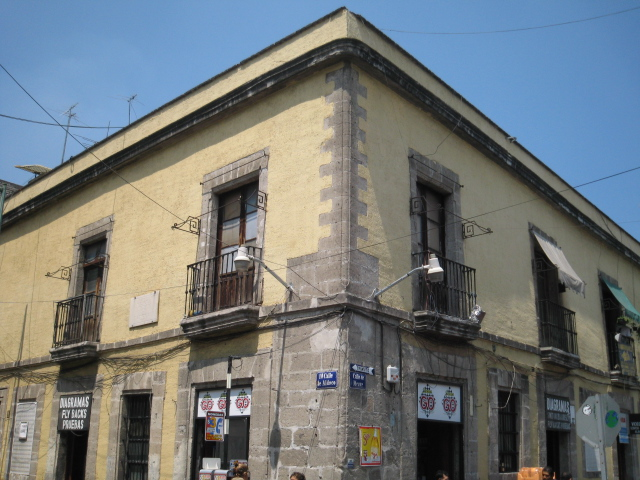
Ángela Peralta's house in Mexico City

On a visit to Mexico in 1871, Peralta established her own touring opera company for which she frequently sang her signature roles – Amina in La sonnambula and Lucia in Lucia di Lammermoor. In her lifetime, she sang Amina 122 times, and Lucia 166 times. In the mid-1870s she began an affair with the Mexican lawyer and entrepreneur Julián Montiel y Duarte, which caused a scandal in Mexico City. The city's social elite boycotted her performances and hired hecklers to harass her during performances. Her reputation recovered following her performance in Linda di Chamounix, but she kept her vow never to sing in Mexico City again.

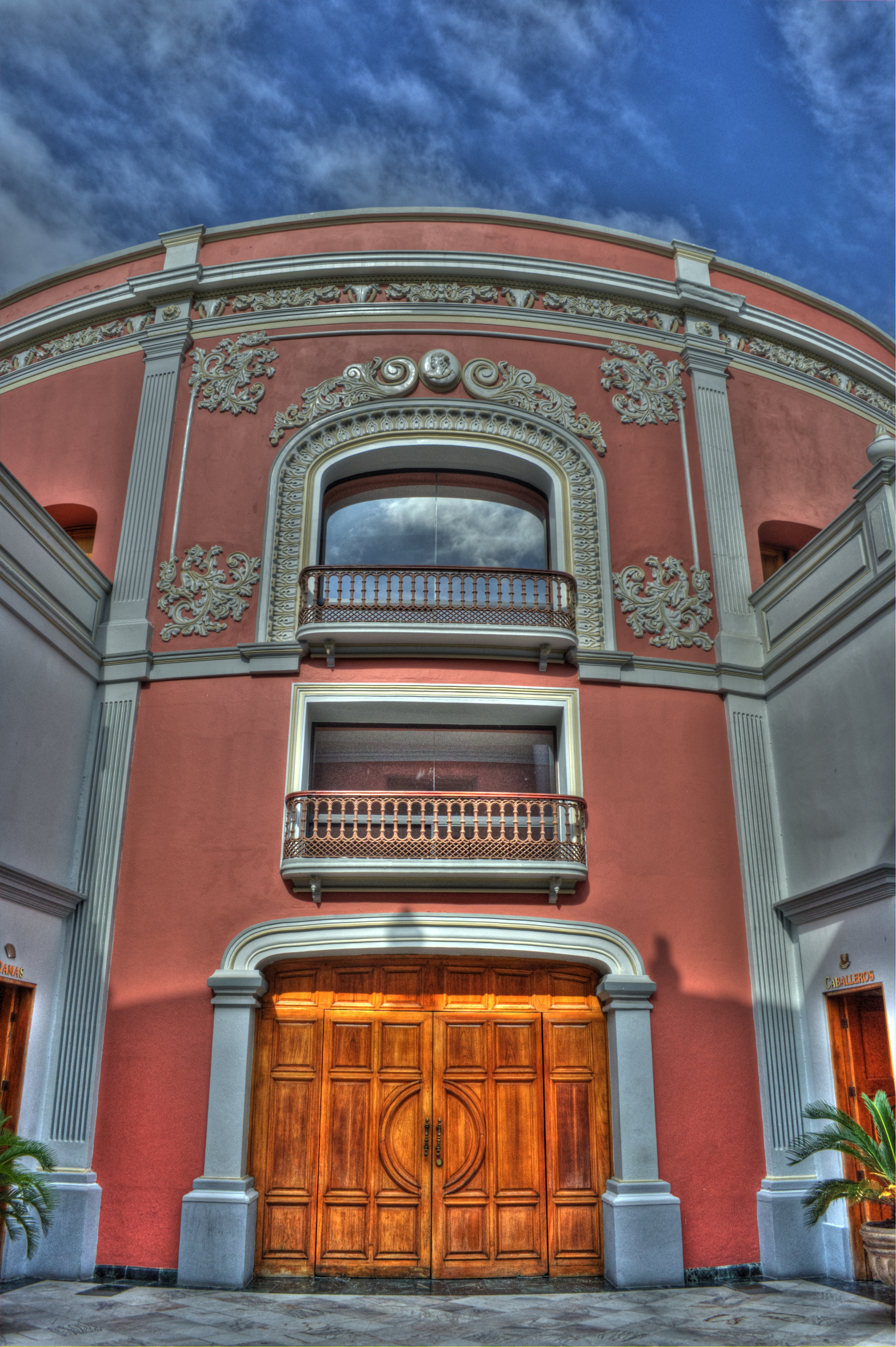
Façade of the Teatro Ángela Peralta in downtown Mazatlán

In 1883, with her reputation (and economic situation) again in decline, she began a tour of northern Mexico with her troupe of Italian opera singers. The tour began in Guaymas and proceeded to La Paz, Baja California Sur. It was in La Paz that she sang for the last time on stage – the title role in Maria di Rohan – with the performance taking place in a theatre improvised from a disused sand pit. On 22 August, the troupe arrived in the port city of Mazatlán, where they were to perform Il trovatore and Aida. The city of Mazatlán prepared an elaborate welcome for her. Her boat docked at a pier decorated with garlands of flowers, and she was greeted by a band playing the Mexican National Anthem. When her carriage arrived, her admirers unhitched the horses and pulled it themselves to the Hotel Iturbide, where she once again saluted the crowds from her balcony. However, within a few days, she and 76 of the troupe's 80 members died in the yellow fever epidemic that swept the city shortly after their arrival.

Ángela Peralta died in the Hotel Iturbide in Mazatlán at the age of 38 on 30 August 1883. She married her lover Julián Montiel y Duarte on her deathbed. According to an eyewitness account of the marriage ceremony, she was already unconscious when it took place. One of the singers from her company, Lemus, supported her by the shoulders. When asked if she took Montiel y Duarte as her husband, Lemus moved her head to make it appear that she was nodding her assent. Before her burial in Mazatlán, her body lay in state, dressed in one of her opera costumes and her best jewels. In 1937, her remains were disinterred and brought to the Rotunda de Hombres Ilustres (the Rotunda of Illustrious People) in Mexico City's Panteón de Dolores.

== Voice and repertoire ==
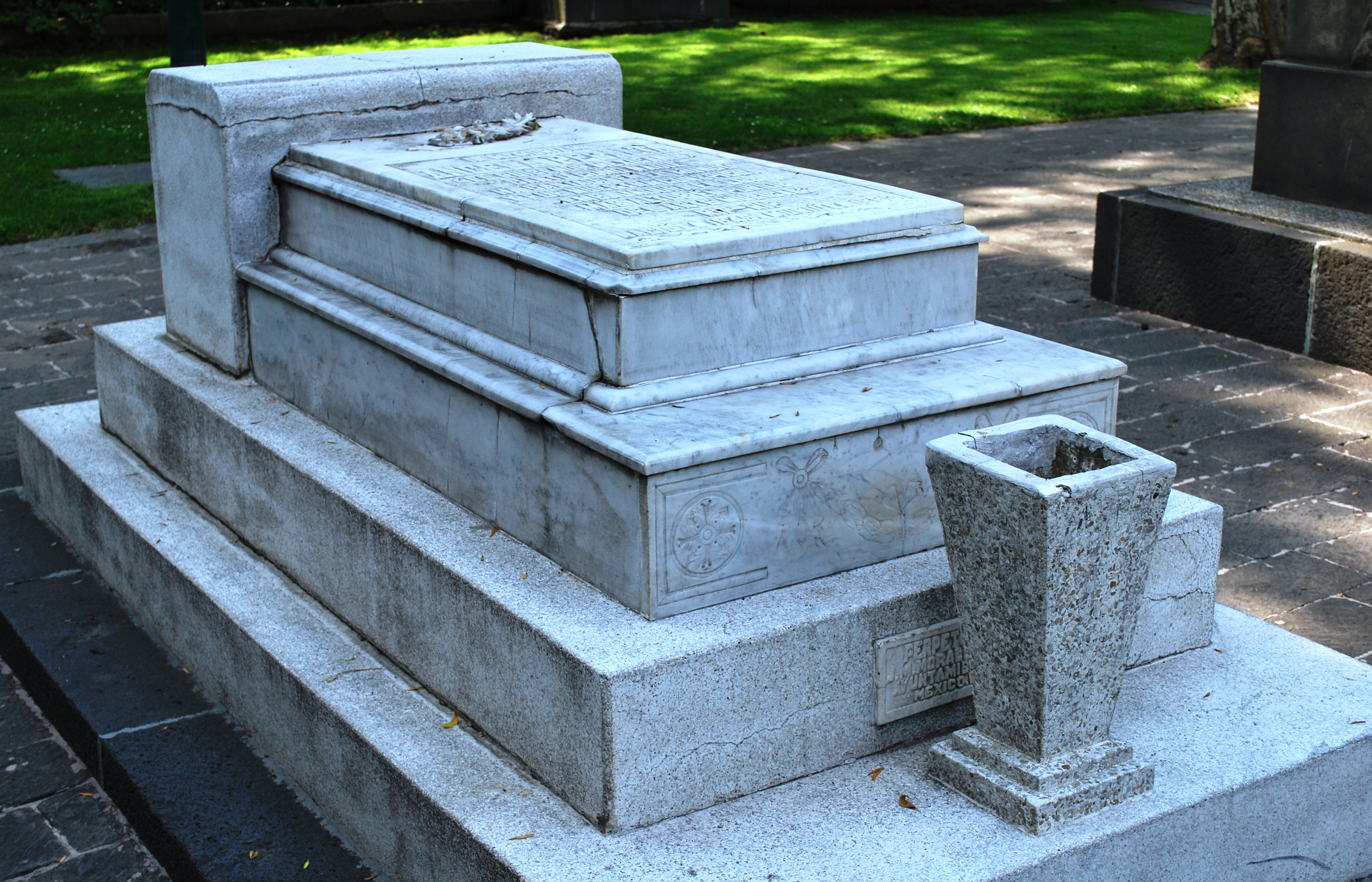
Ángela Peralta's tomb

A Mazatlán opera-lover and journalist, who watched Peralta rehearsing in the Teatro Rubio on 22 August 1883, wrote in his diary:

She is a woman with an agreeable presence, slightly obese, with bulging but very lively eyes. She has a wonderful voice that produces notes from the very highest to the lowest with astounding ease; she sang several variations with such delicate notes, like the trill of a goldfinch...

Peralta's wide-ranging repertoire included: Leonora in Il trovatore, Violetta in La traviata; Elvira in I puritani; Marie in La fille du régiment; Amina in La sonnambula; Adina in L'elisir d'amore; and the title roles in Aida, Dinorah, Linda di Chamounix, Maria di Rohan, Lucia di Lammermoor, and Norma. She also created the leading female roles in three operas by Mexican composers: Ildegonda (1866) and Gino Corsini (1877) by Melesio Morales, and Guatimotzin (1871) by Aniceto Ortega del Villar.

== Legacy ==
There are several tributes to Peralta across Mexico. Among them is the Ángela Peralta Esplanade, a pedestrian corridor connecting the Palacio de Bellas Artes and the Alameda Central, sometimes used for open air performances. Another notable example is the Ángela Peralta Amphitheater in the Parque Lincoln of Polanco, Mexico City. Both Mazatlán and San Miguel de Allende have theatres named in her honour.

On July 6, 2021, Google celebrated her 175th birthday with a Google Doodle.

== Notes ==
=== References ===
- Gaxiola Aldana, Yovana, Rercodarán la voz de Ángela Peralta en Mazatlán, El Universal, 13 August 2008 (in Spanish). Accessed 29 August 2008.
- Gugliotta, Bobette, Women of Mexico: The Consecrated and the Commoners, 1519–1900, Floricanto Press, 1989, pp. 164–165.
- Standish, Peter, A Companion to Mexican Studies, Boydell & Brewer Ltd, 2006, p. 70. ISBN 1-85566-134-9.
- Stevenson, Robert, "Peralta, Angela" in Stanley Sadie (ed.), The New Grove Dictionary of Opera, Grove's Dictionaries of Music, 1992, Vol. 3, pp. 948–949.
- Werner, Michael S., Concise Encyclopedia of Mexico, Taylor & Francis, 2001, p. 526. ISBN 1-57958-337-7.
