= Guadalupe Olmedo =

- Born: María Daría Guadalupe Tomasa Olmedo y de la Lama; December 12, 1853; Toluca
- Died: May 11, 1889
- Occupations: Composer, pianist
- Spouse: Melesio Morales

María Daría Guadalupe Tomasa Olmedo y de la Lama (December 12, 1853 – May 11, 1889) was a Mexican pianist and composer. She is thought to have composed the first formal string quartet in Mexico, her Quartetto studio classico, op. 14 (1875).

Guadalupe Olmedo was born on December 12, 1853 in Toluca, the daughter of Manuel Olmedo Mendoza and Pomposa de la Lama Segovia de Olmedo. She was musically accomplished at an early age. At 12, Emperor Maximilian requested she perform at the National Palace. She studied under Melesio Morales (whom she would later marry), Agustín Caballero and Cenobio Paniagua. In 1875, she submitted fifteen completed works as part of her examinations for the Conservatorio Nacional de Música. The school's jury awarded her a silver medal with an inscription calling her the first female Mexican classical composer.

On November 23, 1887, she married Melesio Morales. Alfredo Bablot of the Conservatorio conducted the orchestra playing Mendelssohn's Wedding March. She died a year and a half later, on May 11, 1889.

== Works ==
- Luz , opus 1 for piano
- Illustrazione , opus 2 (on motifs from Meyerbeer’s Les Huguenots)
- Coro de la ópera Norma de V. Bellini, op. 3, for flutes, oboes, clarinets and bassoons 1874
- Morí!, op. 4, for mezzosoprano or tenor and piano
- Ildegonda , opus 5 (paraphrase on Melesio by Morales)
- Aida de Verdi, op. 6, 1877, transcription for piano
- Taci mio cor! , opus 7, alto or tenor and piano
- Obertura de la ópera Romeo y Julieta de Bellini, op. 9, for orchestra
- Coro, op. 11, for basses and baritones
- Cavatina, op. 12, for mezzosoprano and piano
- Quartetto Studio Classico, opus 14, for string quartet
- La Africana, op.13, 4 pianos for 16 hands, transcription on themes from Meyerbeer's opera L'Africaine, 1875
- Luisa, opus 15, overture for orchestra (1875)
- Trío for piano, op. 17
- Segunda Reverie , opus 28, for piano
