= Guatimotzin =

Opera

- Opera by Aniceto Ortega
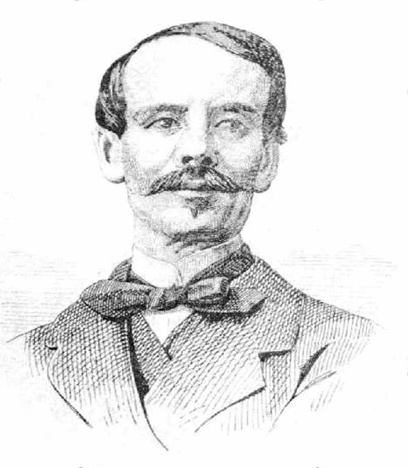
- The composer
- Librettist: José Tomás de Cuéllar
- Language: Spanish
- Premiere: 13 September 1871; Gran Teatro Nacional, Mexico City

Guatimotzin is an opera in one act and nine scenes composed by Aniceto Ortega del Villar to a libretto in Spanish by José Tomás de Cuéllar. It premiered on 13 September 1871 at the Gran Teatro Nacional in Mexico City. Described as an episodio musical (musical episode), its plot is based on the defense of Mexico by its last Aztec emperor, Cuauhtémoc (also known as Guatimotzin). It was one of the earliest Mexican operas to use a native subject.

== Background and performance history ==
A romanticised account of the heroic but doomed defense of Mexico by its last Aztec emperor, Cuauhtémoc, Guatimotzin was one of the earliest Mexican operas to use a native subject and to incorporate indigenous music into its score.

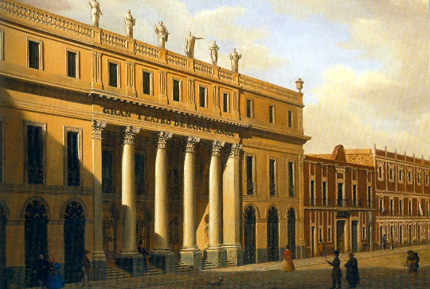
The Gran Teatro Nacional in Mexico City where Guatimotzin premiered in 1871

Aniceto Ortega, who was also a prominent physician and surgeon, worked on the composition in his free time between patients and late at night. His references to native music can be seen especially in the dances "Tlaxcalteca" (which quotes a Mexican folk tune, "El perico") and "Tzotzopizahuac". According to Robert Stevenson, the latter resembles the third movement of Beethoven's Seventh Symphony rather more than it does indigenous music, but the score would later cause Ortega "to be hailed as a Mexican Glinka".

The libretto in Spanish verse was written by José Tomás de Cuéllar, a well-known poet, playwright, and novelist and the editor of several Mexican periodicals, including La Linterna Magica and La Illustracion Potosina. His fictional works often had a spiritual element and dealt with themes from native Mexican culture. When de Cuéllar became ill at one point, Ortega also worked on parts of the libretto.

Guatimotzin premiered on 13 September 1871 at the Gran Teatro Nacional in Mexico City. It was performed as a benefit for the conductor, Enrico Moderati, by members of Ángela Peralta's opera company with Enrico Tamberlik in the title role. The sets and costumes were designed by Riccardo Fontana, based on drawings in the Mendoza Codex and advice from prominent historians. According to the art historian, Christopher Fulton, the opera's premiere was its sole performance. However, its staging may have influenced the depiction of Cuauhtémoc's torture and death in the bronze relief by Gabriel Guerra on the Cuauhtémoc Monument in Mexico City.

== Principal roles ==
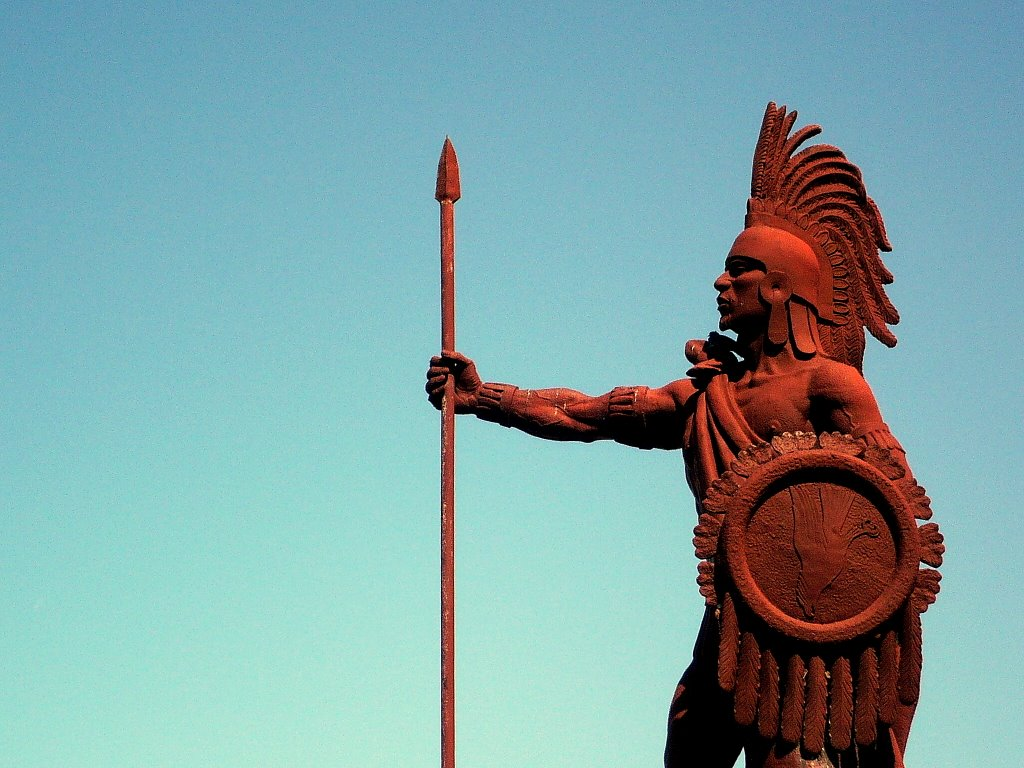
Monument in Veracruz to Cuauhtémoc, on whom the title role of Guatimotzin is based

- Princess Malintzin (soprano) created by Ángela Peralta
- Cuauhtémoc (tenor) created by Enrico Tamberlik
- Hernán Cortés (bass) created by Louis Gassier.

== Sources ==
- Bonaparte, Roland, Le Mexique au début du 20e siècle, C. Delagrave, 1904
- Cambas, Manuel Rivera, México Pintoresco, Vol. 1, La Reforma, 1880
- de Olavarría y Ferrari, Enrique, Reseña histórica del teatro en México, Volume 3, La Europea, 1895
- Fulton, Christopher, "Cuauhtémoc regained", Estudios de Historia Moderna y Contemporánea de México, No. 36, January–June 2008, pp. 5–47
- García Mora, Carlos and Krotz, Esteban, La Antropología en México: Panorama histórico, Volume 9, Instituto Nacional de Antropología e Historia, 1988. ISBN 968-6038-72-8
- Grout, Donald Jay and Williams, Hermine Weigel, A short history of opera, Columbia University Press, 2003. ISBN 0-231-11958-5
- International Musicological Society, Report of the International Musicological Society Congress, Vol. 1, Bärenreiter, 1993
- Price, Curtis Alexander et al., Italian Opera in Late Eighteenth-century London: The King's Theatre, Haymarket, 1778-1791, Oxford University Press, 1995. ISBN 0-19-816166-2
- Stevenson, Robert (2001). "Ortega del Villar, Aniceto". In Sadie, Stanley; Tyrrell, John (eds.). The New Grove Dictionary of Music and Musicians (2nd ed.). London: Macmillan Publishers. ISBN 978-1-56159-239-5.
- Velázquez, Guillermo Orta, Breve historia de la música en México, Librería de M. Porrúa, 1971
- Werner, Michael S., Concise encyclopedia of Mexico, Taylor & Francis, 2001. ISBN 1-57958-337-7
