= Gustavo Campa =

Mexican composer (1863–1934)

- Born: Gustavo Emilio Campa; September 8, 1863; Mexico City
- Died: October 29, 1934 (aged 71)
- Occupation: composer

Gustavo Emilio Campa (8 September 1863 in Mexico City – 29 October 1934) was a Mexican composer. He studied piano with Felipe Larios and Julio Ituarte, and composition with Melisio Morales at the Conservatorio Nacional in Mexico City. Campa went against Morales' well known passion for Italian style of composition and lead a group of rebellious students which embraced the French style.

In 1900 he was appointed professor of Composition and History of Music at the institution, a position he will hold until his retirement in 1925. In 1907, upon the death of Ricardo Castro, Campa became the director of the Conservatorio.
