= Partenope (Zumaya) =

1711 opera in three acts by Manuel de Zumaya

- Opera by Manuel de Zumaya
- Librettist: Zumaya
- Language: Spanish
- Based on: Silvio Stampiglia's Italian libretto
- Premiere: 1 May 1711; Mexico City

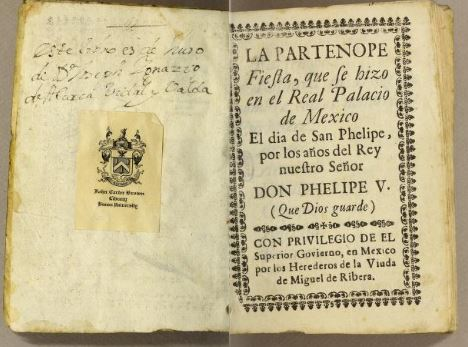
Titlepage of libretto of Zumaya's opera 'Partenope', 1714

Partenope is an opera in three acts by Manuel de Zumaya. Zumaya adapted the libretto himself from a Spanish translation of Silvio Stampiglia's Italian libretto which was first set for performance in Naples during 1699 with music by Luigi Mancia. All told, Stampiglia's libretto was used by a variety of composers for more than a dozen operas that were produced all over Italy, including versions by Leonardo Vinci and George Frideric Handel. Zumaya's version was commissioned by Viceroy Fernando de Alencastre Noroña y Silva and produced at the viceregal palace palace of the Duke of Linares in Mexico City on 1 May 1711. The production is the earliest known full Italian opera produced in North America and the first opera written by an American-born composer. However, Parténope is not the earliest opera to be performed in the New World, as some sources have reported. That distinction belongs to Tomás de Torrejón y Velasco's La púrpura de la rosa, which premiered ten years earlier in Lima, Peru.

Partenope may not have been the first stage work by Zumaya that contained music. He had previously written the play Rodirigo for the birth of Crown Prince Luis in 1708. It is possible that he may have also composed music for this play. Unfortunately, both the score of Zumaya's opera and any music he may have written for the play has now been lost.

== Composition history ==
Stampiglia wrote his libretto just before the beginning of the War of the Spanish Succession, which largely started due to the collapse of complicated negotiations over lands in all parts of Europe, especially in Italy. The story of this libretto reflects the kinds of political intrigues occurring in Italy, Spain, and many other European nations prior to the onset of the War. The story resonated well with audiences of the day because they recognized the political confusion as reflective of their times. This is one reason why Zumaya and so many other composers chose to use Stampiglia's libretto during the early eighteenth century.

== Roles ==
In Stampiglia's original libretto, the characters are as follows:

- Rosmira, Princess of Cyprus
- Partenope, Queen of Partenope (later Naples)
- Arsace, Prince of Corinth
- Armindo, Prince of Rhodes
- Emilio, Prince of Cuma
- Ormonte, Captain of Partenope's Guard

Zumaya adds the characters Anfrisa and Beltran

== Synopsis ==
Partenope (or Parthenope) appears in Greek mythology and classical literature and art as one of the sirens who taunted Odysseus. One version of the tale depicts her throwing herself into the sea because her love for Odysseus was not returned. She drowns and her body washes up on the shore of Naples, which was called Partenope after her name. From this, Silvio Stampiglia created a fictional account where Partenope appears as the Queen of Naples.

Handel's opera Partenope which also uses a version of Stampiglia's libretto, has the following outline.

Prince Arsace and Prince Armindo are seeking Queen Partenope, the founder of the city of Naples, in marriage. Meanwhile, Prince Emilio is at war with Naples and with Partenope. Partenope is primarily attracted to Arsace. However, she does not know that Arsace has previously abandoned Rosmira, who is disguised as a man, named Eurimene, and is trying to win him back. Rosmira, as Eurimene, confronts him and harasses him for his faithlessness, and demands that he keep her true identity secret. Ultimately, Rosmira/Eurimene challenges her lover to a duel in a court of honour, but her identity is revealed when he demands the condition that they fight stripped to the waist.

== See also ==
- Opera in Latin America
- List of Mexican operas

== Sources ==
- Gasta, Chad M. (2003), “Public Reception, Politics and Propaganda in Torrejón’s La púrpura de la rosa, the First New World Opera.” Latin American Theatre Review 37.1 (2003): 43–60.
- Lindgren, Lowell, "Silvio Stampiglia", Grove Music Online ed. L. Macy (Accessed September 18, 2008), (subscription access)
- Russell, Craig H. Russell, "Manuel de Zumaya", Grove Music Online ed. L. Macy (Accessed September 18, 2008), (subscription access)
- Stein, Louise K (1992), "Púrpura de la rosa, La" in The New Grove Dictionary of Opera, ed. Stanley Sadie (London) ISBN 0-333-73432-7
- Zumaya, Manuel (1714). La Partenope fiesta, : que se hizo en el Real Palacio de Mexico el dia de San Phelipe, por los años del Rey nuestro señor don Phelipe V. (que Dios guarde).
