= Felipe de Jesús Villanueva Gutiérrez =

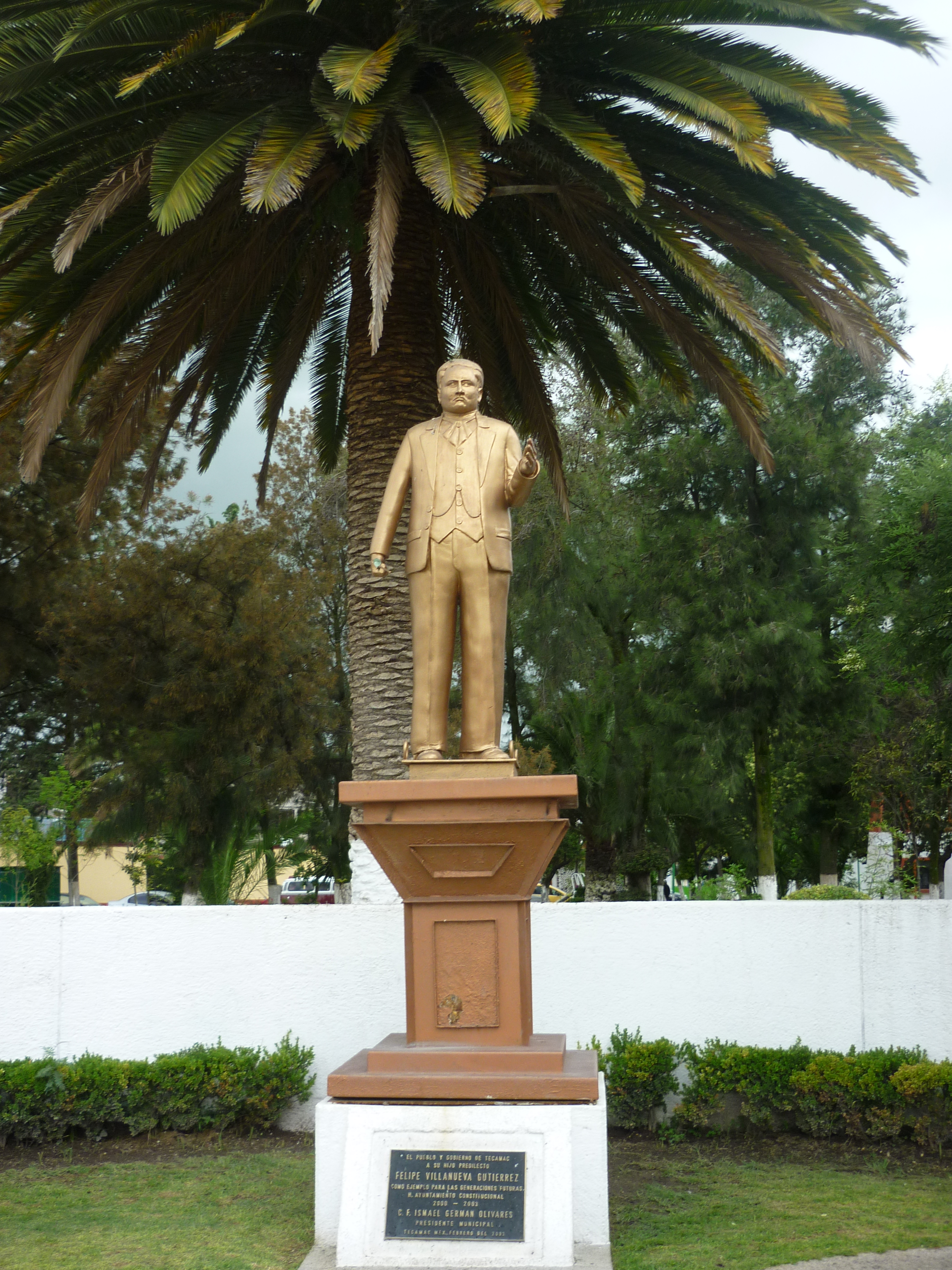
Felipe Villanueva was a composer, he born in Tecamac, Mexico in 1862.

Felipe de Jesús Villanueva Gutiérrez (5 February 1862 – 28 May 1893) was a Mexican violinist, virtuoso pianist and composer. Villanueva remains one of the most well-known figures of the Mexican musical romanticism – flourishing during the historical period known in Mexico as the Porfiriato.

== Biography ==
At the age of ten, Villanueva wrote his Patriotic Cantata, for piano and four voices – a year later, he composed a Mazurka for piano The Last Farewell. In 1873, Villanueva was accepted into the National Conservatory of Music under the director of the establishment, Alfredo Bablot. However, he was later rejected from the conservatory, therein commenced studies in piano and harmony in private classes with the teacher Antonio Valle.

In 1876, at the age of fourteen, he entered as a violinist the orchestra of the Teatro Hidalgo directed by José C. Camacho, from whom he received composition lessons. In 1879 the international company Wagner and Levien Sucs. published pieces for piano: The Eruption of Peñol and The Arrival of the Cyclone, which became known among the Mexican public.

In 1887, he founded, together with Ricardo Castro, Gustavo E. Campa and other Mexican musicians – the Musical Institute – an official academy of the Group of Six, which transformed the musical education of Mexico with a fundamental contribution by Villanueva, who published works by Johann Sebastian Bach, Frédéric Chopin, and pianistic giants of his time, including Franz Liszt and Anton Rubinstein.

In his book Felipe Villanueva Gutiérrez, his time, his life, his work, Professor José Ovando Ramírez discusses how Villanueva developed his work at a time in which Italian music predominated the musical preferences of Europe and America, including Mexico. Together with the influence of Viennese Waltz, which was introduced to Mexico by an Austrian orchestra during the reign of Emperor Maximilian, Italian music added to the originality of the Mexican musical compositions. These influences shaped Villanueva and his composition into one of the primary precursors of Mexican musical nationalism in the nineteenth century, when the Mexican waltz was distinguished by songs such as "God never dies" by Macedonio Alcalá; "On the waves" by Juventino Rosas; and the waltzes "Causerie," "Love," "Ebelia," "In dance," "Golden dream," and dances "Ana, "and "Luz" by Villanueva.

Although he died prematurely in 1893 at the age of 31, he left numerous works for piano, for singing and piano, and the comic opera Keofar (1892), which premiered at the Teatro Principal in Mexico City, with great success. His poetic Waltz is known both in his version for piano alone and in the symphonic arrangement made by Gustavo E. Campa. His work for piano has been recorded by several Mexican concert-goers. His remains were interred in 1945 to the Rotunda of Illustrious Persons.

== Compositions ==
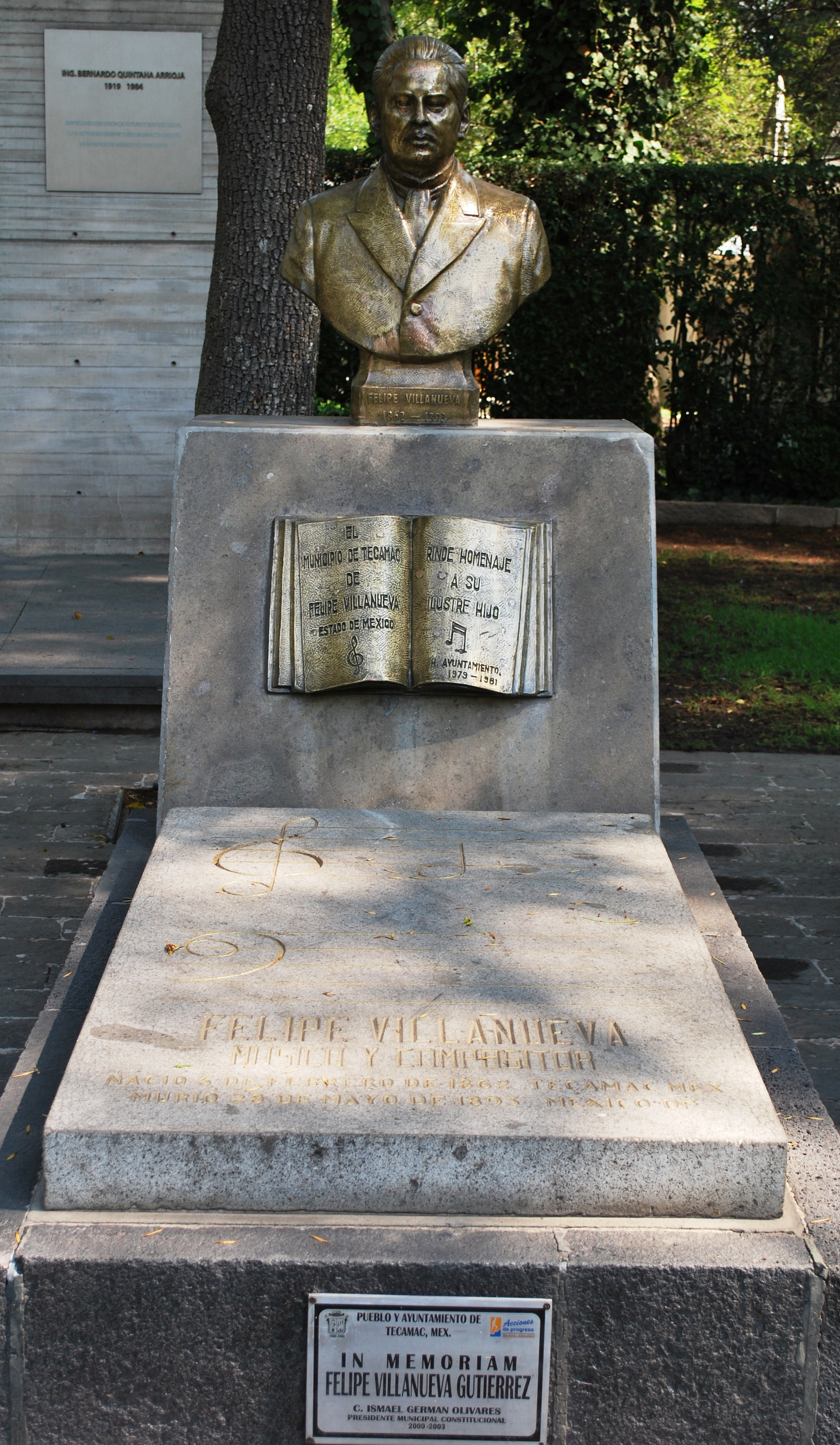
Tomb of Felipe Villanueva in the Panteon Civil de Dolores cemetery in Mexico City.

- Nocturno "Amar" (1872)
- Idolina (1872)
- Lamento (1872)
- Mazurka "Sueño Dorado" (1872)
- Un día de asueto (1872)
- Mazurka "La despedida" (1873)
- Danza "El último adiós" (1874)
- Vals "La caída de las montañas de Tecámac" (1876)
- Vals "A orillas del Guadalquivir", Vals "Natalia" (1879)
- Danza "La brisa", Danza "La erupción del peñol", Danza "La llegada del ciclón" (1880)
- Mazurka No. 3 Op. 27 (1886)
- Schottisch "Ana", Schottisch "¡Ay qué dos!", Danza "La pedradas", Schottisch "Luz" (1887)
- Gavota, a cuatro manos (1888)
- Vals lento "Causerie", Vals poético (1890)
- Lamento, a la memoria del gran patricio Benito Juárez (1891)
- Mazurka "Sueño Dorado" (1892)
- Keofar (1892)
- Vals de salón "Amor", Minueto (Fecha de la composición desconocida)
- Vals de salón "Amor", Minueto (Fecha de la composición desconocida)

Seis danzas humorísticas. Algo se pesca. ¿Y por qué?. ¡Oh!, la, la. Amorosa. Adelante. Enredo. Dos danzas. Cupido. Venus. Dos gavotas. Ebelia, mazurka de salón. El cariño, vals. En el paraíso, dos danzas. Adán. Eva. En el baile, mazurka. María, mazurka. Mariquita, polka. Primera mazurka, Op. 20. Segunda mazurka, Op. 25. Tercera mazurka, Op. 27. Recuerdo, vals. Un sueño después del baile. Vals de concierto.
