= Tabaré (given name) =

Tabaré is a male name of Guarani origin, meaning "village man". It is used mainly in Uruguay. Notable people with the name include:

- Tabaré Aguerre (born 1957), Uruguayan agronomist and politician
- Tabaré Arapí, Uruguayan folklorist
- Tabaré Cardozo, Uruguayan musician
- Tabaré Etcheverry, Uruguayan folklorist
- Tabaré Gallardo, Uruguayan astronomer
- Tabaré Gómez Laborde, Uruguayan-Argentine cartoonist
- Tabaré Hackenbruch (1928–2017), Uruguayan politician
- Tabaré Larre Borges (1922–?), Uruguayan basketball player
- Tabaré Ramos Uruguayan-American football coach
- Tabaré Rivero, (born 1957), Uruguayan musician, poet and actor
- Tabaré Silva (born 1974), Uruguayan football coach
- Tabaré Vázquez (1940–2020), Uruguayan oncologist and former President
- Tabaré Viera, Uruguayan politician
- Tabaré Viúdez (born 1989), Uruguayan footballer
