= Manuel de Sumaya =

Mexican composer (c. 1678–1755)

- Born: 1680; México, New Spain (now Mexico City, Mexico)
- Died: 21 December 1755 (aged 77); Antequera, Valle de Oaxaca, New Spain (now Oaxaca, Mexico)
- Occupations: Composer, organist, Roman Catholic priest
- Years active: ca. 1690 – 1755
- Era: Baroque
- Notable work: Opera (Partenope, lost), polyphony, Masses (e.g. Misa del tercer tono), Latin-texted liturgical works (e.g. Victimæ paschali laudes), cantatas (e.g., Si ya a aquella nave, Alegres luces del día, Como aunque culpa), villancicos (e.g., Ya se eriza el copete, El sol-fa de Pedro, Cerca de México el templo, Celebren, publiquen, Angélicas milicias')

Manuel de Sumaya (1680 – December 21, 1755) was the most notable composer of New Spain (present-day Mexico). His music represents a synthesis of traditional Spanish musical practices with elements of the Italian style that was becoming influential in the Spanish Empire in the early eighteenth century. It is possible that he was the first New World composer to write an Italian-language opera, entitled Partenope (now lost). Like Antonio Vivaldi, Sumaya was an ordained Roman Catholic priest. His name appears in the historical record spelled as both "Sumaya" and "Zumaya," but the former spelling is more common, particularly in his manuscripts.

== Life ==
Manuel de Sumaya was born in Mexico City in 1680. The exact date of his birth is not known, but he was baptized on January 14, 1680. Around 1690, his parents sought to enroll him in the Mexico City Cathedral choir school. Due to regulations related to limpieza de sangre, only children of pure European descent were allowed to attend. It was discovered that his baptism had been recorded in the books containing non-white baptisms, and so it was moved into those containing white baptisms to ensure his admission.

Sumaya began his studies at the cathedral as a seise (choirboy). There he gained recognition for his exceptional talent and progressed quickly. His name first appeared in a document dated May 25, 1694, when the cathedral chapter provided financial assistance following his father's premature death to prevent him from withdrawing to help support his family. With this support he was able to begin keyboard study with cathedral organist José de Ydiáquez, whose assistant he became in 1708. He continued composition and counterpoint studies with maestro de capilla Antonio de Salazar. In 1710, due to his failing eyesight, Salazar requested of the cathedral chapter that Sumaya be named as his assistant. In 1714, Sumaya was promoted to the position of principal organist. In 1715, Salazar died and Sumaya competed for and was appointed to the post of maestro de capilla, prevailing over his long-time rival Francisco de Atienza. During Sumaya's tenure as maestro, he produced many dictámenes (administrative reports) that reveal him as a composer who placed great value on traditional Spanish counterpoint and harmony, and a maestro de capilla who enforced high standards for the cathedral's music.

Sumaya's play Rodrigo, intended to honor the birth of Crown Prince Luis was performed on August 25, 1707, possibly with his own music. He was also hired by the viceroy, Fernando de Alencastre, 1st Duke of Linares, as a composer and translator. The viceroy commissioned the opera Partenope, which premiered in 1711.

In 1738, after serving 23 years as maestro de capilla in Mexico City, Sumaya moved to Oaxaca, following his friend and protector Tomás Montaño who had recently been appointed as bishop there. It is unclear why he left his position in Mexico City but evidence suggests that he wished to escape the highly political environment there. When he arrived in Oaxaca, the position of maestro de capilla at the cathedral was held by Tomás Salgado. At first Sumaya served as Montaño's chaplain and worked as a notary. Later, on November 16, 1742, he was appointed interim curate of the cathedral parish. In 1745, Salgado was demoted from his position as maestro de capilla, presumably to allow Sumaya to assume the post, which he did on January 11 of that year. He expanded the cathedral capilla by hiring choristers and instrumentalists, oversaw the installation of a new organ, and mentored several promising musicians.

Sumaya died on December 21, 1755 in Oaxaca. He was buried in the Chapel of St. Anthony of Padua in the Sagrario, adjacent to the cathedral.

== Musical style ==
Sumaya's surviving output demonstrates fluency in not only traditional Spanish musical styles but also Italianate ones that were becoming more common in the Spanish Empire during his life.

A collection of polyphony surviving in the Mexico City Cathedral archive serves both as evidence of his mastery of traditional counterpoint and of his development as a musician. The motets are for various feasts including the Conversion of St. Paul, Corpus Christi, Holy Cross, St. Peter, St. Joseph, and St. Gabriel. There are also two settings of Marian antiphons (Ave Regina cælorum and Alma Redemptoris Mater). Many of the pieces in this collection make use of the original plainchant melody, and each is in two parts, in most cases with Sumaya having completed one part and his teacher Salazar the other. These motets are ostensibly examples of stile antico counterpoint. Closer examination, however, reveals more adventurous harmony that at times incorporates augmented and diminished chords, secondary dominants, and the regular use of less-common chord voicings (such as placing the dissonant note in the bass).

Sumaya's surviving villancicos fall into two categories. The first are largely characterized by lightly contrapuntal triple-meter choral estribillos written in a late form of mensural notation and coplas with a more regular phrase structure, written in modern notation, often in duple meter and sung by one or more soloists. The texts are often erudite and neo-Platonic and tell stories or explain doctrine related to the feast for which the villancico is intended. Stylistically, they resemble those of Salazar and Juan Hidalgo, and are ultimately in the style of seventeenth-century Spanish theatre music. Sumaya's surviving villancicos in the Mexico City Cathedral Archive are of this type.

The second type adopts more Italianate musical gestures in melodic writing and uses instruments more associated with concerted Italian baroque sacred music, such as the violin, trumpet, and oboe. Melodies are more periodic and sequential, and cadences are more strongly marked. On the surface these villancicos seem purely Italianate, but Sumaya maintains enough characteristics of the first type such that these works are actually hybrid: an Italianate "crust" surrounds a Spanish harmonic and textual "core." Spanish characteristics include the use of polychorality, erudite texts related to the intended feast day, and a more conservative harmonic structure based more on seventeenth-century models than on emerging functional tonality.

The sacred cantatas stand as Sumaya's most strongly Italianate genre. He likely modeled his cantatas after those of prominent Spanish composers such as Antonio de Literes and José de Torres, who had modeled their own works after Italian cantatas. One of the most cosmopolitan characteristics of the cantatas is their use of recitativo secco and the da capo aria, two of the most common forms of not only Italian cantatas, but also operas. Some, like Como aunque culpa, consist of a single recitative-aria pair. Others, such as Si ya a aquella nave, are composed of two such pairs, preceded by a slow, through-composed triple-meter aria as was common in Spanish cantatas. Because of the use of the solo voice, the cantatas more blatantly exhibit Italian compositional habits such as sequential melodies, regular phrase structure, and virtuosic singing. As with the villancicos, however, Italianate surface features overlay a Spanish harmonic foundation.

The composer's Latin-texted works consist of examples of both traditional and progressive musical styles. The Cláusulas de la Passión for the liturgy on Holy Saturday is set in the manner of austere stile antico polyphony as in the motet collection discussed above. Two of his masses—the Misa de tercer tono and the Missa a 5—are in the concerted style and utilize instrumental accompaniment (two violins in the former and violin and oboe in the latter). A third mass (Missa Te Joseph celebrent) is in the more conservative style and calls only for voices and basso continuo. His psalm settings and sequences contain examples of both compositional styles. Both of his settings of Psalm 121 (Laetatus sum) call for violins, basso continuo, and multiple choirs. By contrast, the sequences Victimæ paschali laudes (Easter) and Lauda Sion (Corpus Christi) and the settings of Psalms 116 (Laudate Dominum) and 147 (Lauda Jerusalem) use only voices and continuo.

In 1711, the Duke of Linares, Viceroy of New Spain and a devotee of Italian opera, commissioned Sumaya to translate Italian libretti and write new music for them. The libretto of one of these, La Parténope, survives in the Biblioteca Nacional de Mexico in Mexico City, though the music has been lost. It is unclear whether the opera was sung throughout, as was the case in Hidalgo's La púrpura de la rosa (1660), or consisted of spoken dialogue interspersed with songs, as in the zarzuela and comedia traditions.

== Selected works ==
The motet Egregie Doctor Paule, for the Feast of the Conversion of St. Paul, is notable for demonstrating Sumaya's musical education. The prima pars was composed by Salazar, while the secunda pars is by Sumaya. There are subtle yet noticeable differences between the two composers' work, with Sumaya's being more likely to engage in harmonic daring and less-common chord voicings and resolutions. Such colorful harmonies were becoming more common in Spain as Italian treatises and compositions spread throughout the kingdom. The 1738 edition of José de Torres' figured bass treatise refers to them as posturas falsas and posturas extravagantes. Posturas falsas include chords involving chromatic alterations, including what are today regarded as dominant seventh and fully-diminished seventh chords. Posturas extravagantes refer to any chord involving the simultaneous use of the minor third and augmented fourth, or any chord that includes the less common sonorities of the minor second and major seventh.

Sumaya's villancico El sol-fa de Pedro, written as part of his examen de oposición (audition) for the post as maestro de capilla of Mexico City Cathedral, is an example of a villancico de precisión. In such a villancico, the composer demonstrates his compositional prowess and musical erudition through the musical setting of a text containing puns and wordplay related to musical terms. As Christ was often associated with the Sun in such texts, this technique applied to the word "sol" (sun) was common. For example, in an F-based tonality, the pitch C (the fifth scale degree, "sol" in solfège) would be associated with the word "sol" (sun).

The cantata Si ya a aquella nave, for the Feast of St. Peter, is one of Sumaya's most Italianate works. Set for alto voice accompanied by two violins and basso continuo, it is notable for its use of text painting. Perhaps the most notable instance is in the first da capo aria ("Prosigue, prosigue al mismo correr"). Sumaya alters the typical ABA formal scheme by appending to the B section a highly chromatic passage involving the bass descending chromatically over nearly two octaves, with the violins providing an accompaniment of falling figures that vividly portrays the words "llanto" ("weeping") and "morir" ("to die"). The bass line emphasizes every fourth note as it descends, articulating a series of descending chromatic tetrachords in a characteristic lamento bass pattern.

Ya se eriza el copete, for the Feast of Our Lady of Guadalupe, is a notable example of a more traditional villancico in the style of Salazar or Hidalgo. It is set for two choirs—a solo tenor with basso continuo, a choir of soprano, alto, and tenor with its own basso continuo—and a general accompaniment part. The estribillo, which uses mensural notation, has a text that poetically describes the Guadalupe apparition turning the snowy cold of December (the feast date is December 12) into the flowers of May, a month typically associated with the Virgin Mary. The coplas, written in more modern notation, elaborate on this and tie the villancico more closely to Mexico City with references to St. Juan Diego and the maguey plant.

The large-scale Italianate villancicos Celebren, publiquen; Angélicas milicias; and Albricias, mortales are among Sumaya's most often-performed works. All three are for Marian feasts; the first two are for the Feast of the Assumption and the third for the Feast of the Immaculate Conception. Celebren, publiquen and Albricias, mortales call for one choir of alto and bass soloists with their own basso continuo and a second choir of soprano, alto, and tenor with its own basso continuo. Both of these use an instrumental complement of violins, trumpet, and basso continuo. Angélicas milicias is even larger-scale, set for two choirs of soprano, alto, and tenor, each with its own basso continuo, plus an instrumental complement of violins, viola, oboe, bassoon, and basso continuo. All three are notable for their use of text painting and instrumental color, with violins depicting the twittering of birds in Albricias, mortales and repeated notes in the oboe calling to mind trumpet calls in Angélicas milicias. In spite of the outwardly Italianate style of all three pieces, the harmonic structure, erudite texts, and polychoral setting reveal their Spanish core.
