= Aniceto Ortega =

Mexican physician, composer, and pianist

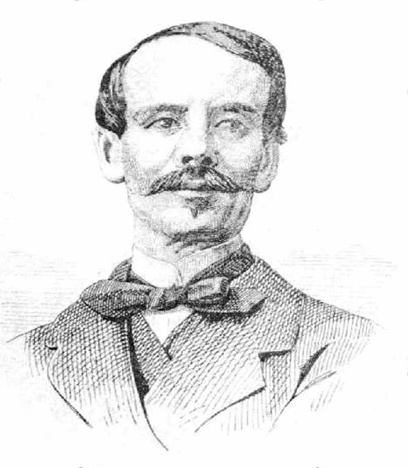
Aniceto Ortega Villar (1825–1875)

Aniceto de los Dolores Luis Gonzaga Ortega del Villar (17 April 1825 – 17 November 1875) was a Mexican medical doctor, composer, and pianist. Although he had a distinguished career as a physician and surgeon, he is also remembered today for his 1871 opera Guatimotzin, one of the earliest Mexican operas to use a native subject. He is related to the Colonial Administrator and Archbishop of Nueva Espana, who became the Viceroy of Nueva Espana twice over. He became Conde del Peñasco by way of marriage, and was a Conde del Oploca by way of birth, amongst other titles.

== Biography ==
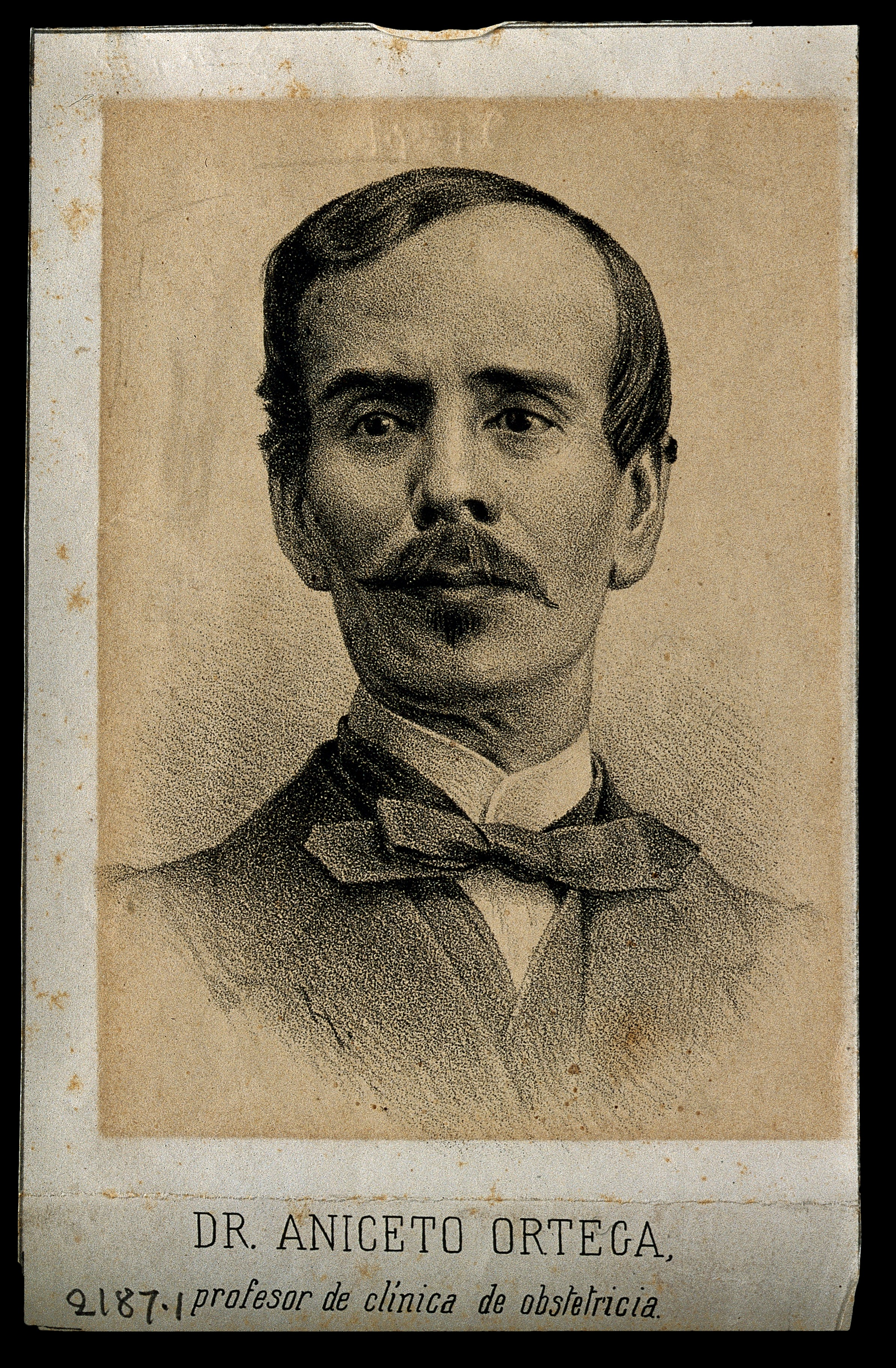
Ortega, Aniceta, fl. ca. 1860.

Aniceto Ortega was born in Tulancingo, Hidalgo, on 17 April 1825, the second of three sons born to Senator Sr. D. Francisco de Ortega-Montañés y Martínez y Navarro, and Countess Sra. Dña. María Josefa del Villar. His father was a statesman active in the Mexican independence movement and a prominent literary figure, who wrote the patriotic verse drama México libre (Free Mexico). Both Ancieto and his older brother, Francisco, studied medicine at the Escuela Nacional de Medicina in Mexico City. There he specialised in obstetrics and gynaecology and received his degree in 1845. After further medical studies in Paris, he went on to become a professor at the medical school in Mexico City and was one of the founders (and later Director) of Mexico's first hospital for women and children, the Casa de Maternidad e Infancia.

Ortega also had a parallel career as a musician. His first composition the Marcha Zaragoza (1862), was named for the Mexican patriot and general, Ignacio Zaragoza, and became Mexico's second national anthem. He composed two other marches, Potosina and Republicana and several piano pieces, most notably Invocación a Beethoven, first performed in 1867. In 1866, he became one of the founders of the Sociedad Filarmónica Mexicana (Mexican Philharmonic Society) which played a crucial role in the establishment of Mexico's National Conservatory of Music. His opera, Guatimotzin, a romanticised account of the defense of Mexico by its last Aztec emperor, Cuauhtémoc, was one of the earliest Mexican operas to use a native subject. Guatimotzin premiered on 13 September 1871 at the Gran Teatro Nacional in Mexico City, with Ángela Peralta and Enrico Tamberlik in the leading roles.

Aniceto Ortega died at the age of 50 on 17 November 1875 in Mexico City and was buried in the chapel of the Escuela Nacional de Medicina. A plaza in central Pachuca, Hidalgo, bears his name.

== Partial list of works ==
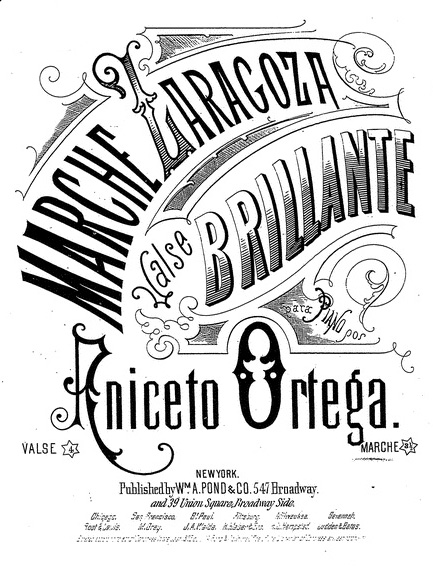
Sheet music for Zaragoza and Brillante, published in 1875 by Pond & Co, New York

Piano

- Invocación a Beethoven
- Elegía, amor e inocencia
- Romanza sin palabras
- El canto de la huilota
- Recuerdo de amistad (dedicated to the Mexican virtuoso pianist and composer, Tomás León)

Waltzes

- Enriqueta (waltz-jarabe)
- Brillante

Marches

- Zaragoza
- Potosina
- Republicana

Opera

- Guatimotzin (in 9 scenes to a libretto by José Cuellar)

== Sources ==
- Elías, Roberto Uribe, La cirugía mexicana en ginecología y obstetricia durante el siglo XIX, Cirugía y Cirujanos, Vol. 75, No. 2, March–April 2007, pp. 139–144 (accessed 26 March 2010, in Spanish)
- Grout, Donald Jay and Williams, Hermine Weigel, A short history of opera, Columbia University Press, 2003. ISBN 0-231-11958-5
- Sierra, Justo (ed.), "Francisco Ortega", Antología del Centenario (originally published in 1910), UNAM, 1985, pp. 140–141. ISBN 968-837-513-6 (in Spanish)
- Sosa, José Octavio, "Ortega, Aniceto", Diccionario de la Ópera Mexicana, Consejo Nacional para la Cultura y las Artes, 2005 (reprinted on operacalli.com with permission of the author) (accessed 26 March 2010, in Spanish)
- Stevenson, Robert (2001). "Ortega del Villar, Aniceto". In Sadie, Stanley; Tyrrell, John (eds.). The New Grove Dictionary of Music and Musicians (2nd ed.). London: Macmillan Publishers. ISBN 978-1-56159-239-5.
- Velázquez, Jorge, El pianismo mexicano del siglo XIX, Anales del Instituto de Investigaciones Estéticas, Vol. XIII, No. 50, 1982, pp. 205–240 (accessed 26 March 2010, in Spanish)
