= Juan Trigos =

Mexican composer and conductor

- Born: Juan Trigos; 1965 (age 60–61); Mexico City, Mexico
- Occupations: Composer and conductor

Juan Trigos (born 1965) is a Mexican-American composer and conductor. He is currently a Professor of Music Theory and Composition at the University of Kentucky College of Fine Arts.

== Biography ==
Trigos was born in Mexico City, Mexico in 1965. He started his studies in music with his father Juan Trigos S., composer and dramaturgist. After he started to study formally at the Conservatorio Nacional de Música (Mexico City, 1977 – 1983) with main teachers Guillermo Noriega, harmony and analysis, José Suárez, counterpoint, Miguel Agustín López, piano. In 1983 he continued his studies at Instituto de Liturgia, Música y Arte Cardenal Miranda in Mexico City where he studied Gregorian Chant, Chorus and Orchestra Conducting, Composition and Piano. After completing these studies moved to Italy in 1986 to deepen his studies on Gregorian Chant, Music Composition, Ancient Polyphony Conducting, Basso Continuo and piano at the Pontificio Istituto di Musica Sacra di Roma where he had the opportunity to work in particular with Domenico Bartolucci (conducting and Bass Continuo), Giovanni Bucci (composition) and Enzo Stanzani (piano). In 1987 he was admitted to the Conservatorio G.Verdi di Milano for two careers Composition and Orchestra direction where his main teacher were respectively Niccoló Castiglioni and Giampiero Taverna. During his stays in Milan he also attended Civica Scuola di Musica di Milano Contemporary Music Department where he studied under the tutelage of Franco Donatoni. Franco Donatoni has been an important figure in the composer's life.

== Honors and awards ==
- 2017: Howard Hanson Visiting Professor. Eastman School of Music (Rochester, NY, USA)
- 2018: Sistema Nacional de Creadores de Artes
- 2018: Global Music Awards Silver Medal - Outstanding Achievement for the recordings of the works Symphony N.4 Nezahualcoyotl Icuicahan and Sonata N.1 for violin and piano
- 2020: Fromm Commission. Fromm Music Foundation at Harvard University (USA)
- 2023: The Azrieli Commission for International Music (Canada). Commission of a new piece for mixed chorus and ensemble to be premiered by the Orchestre symphonique de Montréal Chorus at the AMP Gala Concert on October 28, 2024, given two subsequent international premieres and professionally recorded for a future commercial release. Work "Simetrías Prehispánicas"

== Bibliography ==
- Music Publisher PromoMusica International Ed.
- Millan, Eduardo Soto, Diccionario de compositores Mexicanos de Música de Concierto, tomo II, Mexico, Sociedad de autores y Compositores de México/Fondo de Cultura Económica, 1998, pp. 301–302, ISBN 968-16-4900-1
- Consuelo Carredano, Juan Trigos. Chronology, works's catalog and documentary references, «Pauta, cuadernos de teoria y crítica musical», June–September 2003, nn. 87–88, pgg. 133–156.
