= Ricardo Castro (composer) =

Mexican musician (1864–1907)

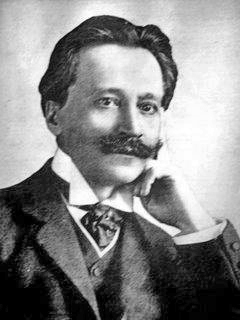
- Born: Ricardo Rafael de la Santísima Trinidad Castro Herrera; 7 February 1864; Nazas, Durango, Mexico
- Died: 27 November 1907 (aged 43); Mexico City, Mexico

Ricardo Rafael de la Santísima Trinidad Castro Herrera (7 February 1864 – 27 November 1907) was a Mexican concert pianist and composer, considered the last romantic of the time of Porfirio Díaz.

== Life ==
Castro was born at the Hacienda de Santa Bárbara, in the municipality of Nazas, Durango. His father, Vicente Castro, was a federal deputy; his mother was María de Jesús Herrera. Castro began his music education with Pedro H. Ceniseros. In 1879, his family moved to Mexico City, where the boy entered the National Conservatory of Music and studied piano with Juan Salvatierra and Julio Ituarte. He studied harmony and counterpoint with Melesio Morales. He finished all his studies in just five years, half of the usual ten. He graduated in 1883.

Castro began his musical career as a concert pianist and composer before finishing his studies. In 1882, he won two prizes. At 19, Castro finished his First Symphony in C Minor; the symphony was premiered in 1988, 81 years after his death.

In 1883, the Government of Mexico chose some of Castro's works to send to Venezuela for the centenary of Simón Bolívar's birth and later in 1884 he made a concert tour through the United States.

1896 was the year of the first premiere of the first act of Castro's opera Atzimba. The second act is lost.

Castro received a scholarship from the Government of Mexico and went to Europe from 1903 to 1906 to give master classes in conservatories in Paris, Brussels, Rome, Milan and Leipzig. He published in Paris many Mexican dances for piano in the Habanera style. He studied with Teresa Carreño while in Europe. When he returned to Mexico, he was appointed music director of the National Conservatory of Music by Justo Sierra and kept that work until he died of pneumonia in Mexico City in November 1907.

== Style ==
Castro's music for piano tends to be very colourful and sentimental with a kind of virtuosity in the style of Liszt. He often connects many musical themes in brilliant passages of virtuosity.

== Legacy ==
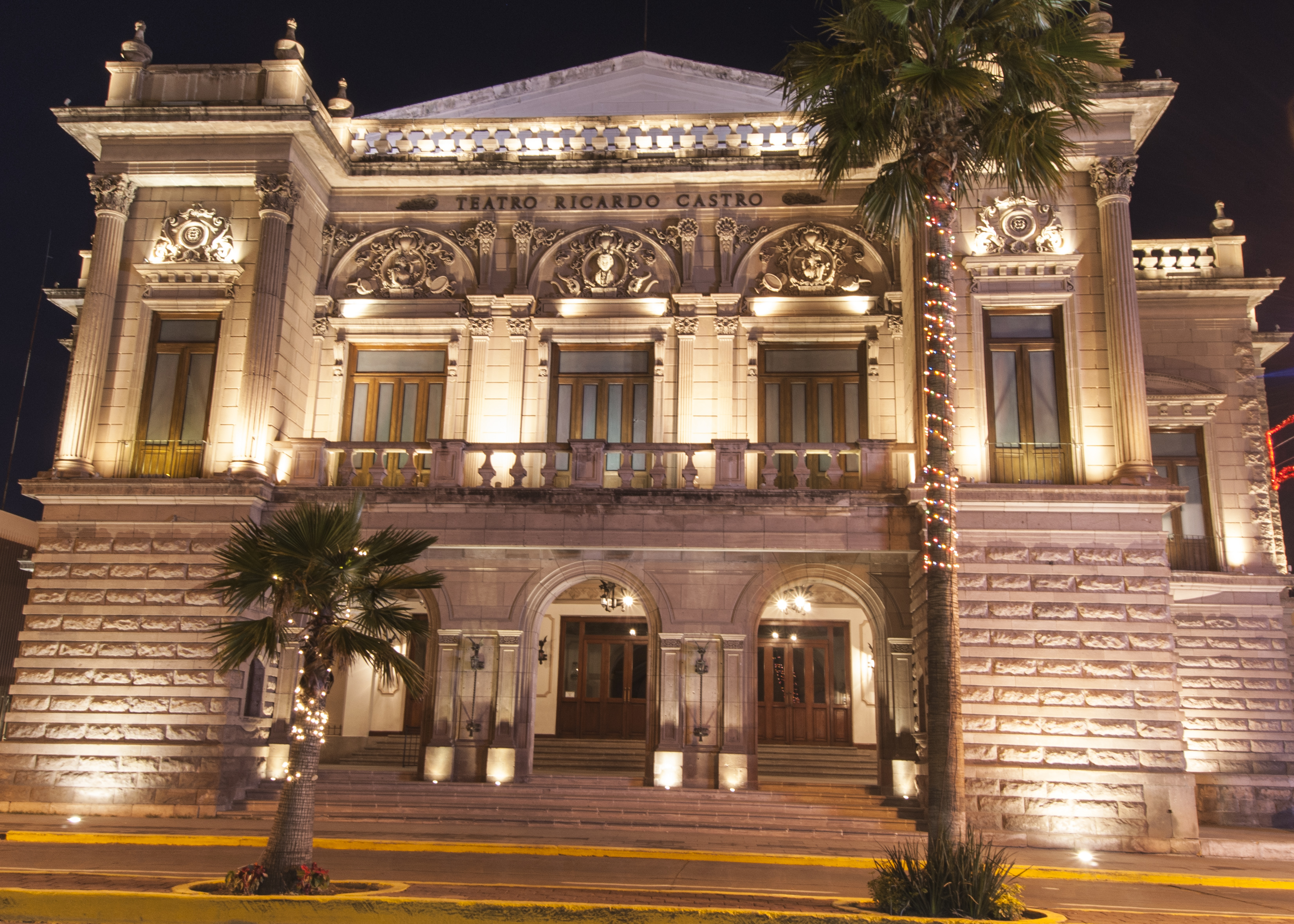
Teatro Ricardo Castro, Durango

The Teatro Ricardo Castro, a concert hall in Victoria de Durango, the capital city of his home state, bears his name.
