= Melesio Morales =

Mexican composer

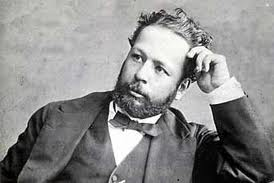
- Born: 4 December 1838
- Died: 12 May 1908; San Pedro de los Pinos
- Occupation: Composer
- Spouse: Guadalupe Olmedo
- Children: Julio Morales Landgrave

Melesio Morales (sometimes spelled Melisio Morales) (December 4, 1838 – May 12, 1908) was a Mexican composer.

Morales was born and died in Mexico City, where he studied music; two of his operas, written in Italian, were performed there. He lived in Europe from 1865 to 1868, and his success in Florence with the opera Ildegonda in 1866 made him a star in his native country. He composed, conducted, and taught in Mexico City until his death. His works include ten operas, two cantatas, and orchestral and choral works.

He was the first artist to conduct Beethoven's symphonies in Mexico.

== Operas ==
Note: This list is incomplete.

- Romeo, 27th January 1863 at the Gran Teatro Nacional
- Ildegonda, drama lírico, 1864
- Gino Corsini, ossia La Maledizione, 1877 at the Gran Teatro Nacional with Angela Peralta as Nella
- Cleopatra, 1891
- Anita, ca. 1900
