= List of compositions by Silvestre Revueltas =

Compositions by Silvestre Revueltas

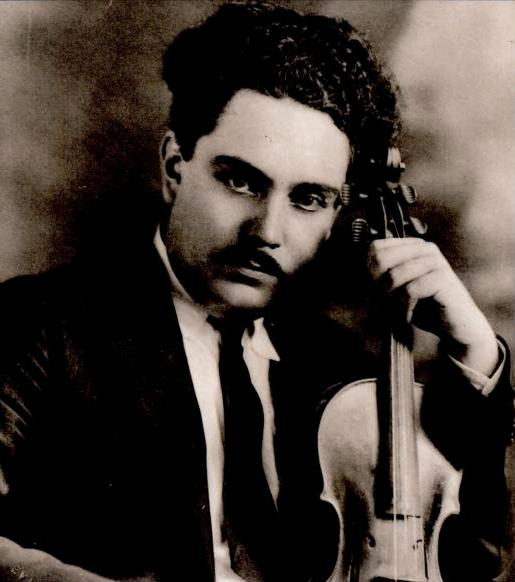
Silvestre Revueltas in 1930

This is a list of compositions by Silvestre Revueltas (1899–1940).

== Stage works ==
=== Ballets ===
- La coronela, 1940 (unfinished; a completion by Blas Galindo and Candelario Huízar lost)
- El renacuajo paseador, 1936

== Orchestral works ==
- Pieza para orquesta, 1929
- Esquinas, 1931 (rev. 1933)
- Cuauhnáhuac, for string orchestra, 1931; revised for full orchestra, 1931; revised again for full orchestra 1932
- Ventanas, 1931
- Alcancías, 1932
- Colorines, for chamber orchestra, 1932
- El renacuajo paseador, 1933
- Janitzio, 1933 (rev. 1936)
- Toccata (sin fuga), for violin and chamber orchestra 1933
- Troka, 1933
- Caminos, 1934
- La coronela (orch. by José Pablo Moncayo and arr. by José Limantour)
- Danza geométrica (orchestral version of Planos), 1934
- Itinerarios, 1938
- Música para charlar, 1938 (from the film score of Ferrocarriles de Baja California)
- Sensemayá, 1938

== Chamber works ==
- El afilador, 1924
- Batik, 1926
- Four Little Pieces for two violins and cello, 1929
- String Quartet No. 1, 1930
- String Quartet No. 2, 1931
- String Quartet No. 3, 1931
- String Quartet No. 4, Música de feria, 1932
- Tres pequeñas piezas serias, for quintet of mixed winds, 1932–33
- Tres piezas, for violin and piano, 1932
- Ocho x radio, 1933
- Planos, 1934
- Homenaje a Federico García Lorca, 1936
- Éste era un rey 1940
- First Little Serious Piece, five wind instruments (piccolo, oboe, clarinet, baritone saxophone, trumpet), 1940
- Second Little Serious Piece, for five wind instruments (piccolo, oboe, clarinet, baritone saxophone, trumpet), 1940

== Film scores ==
- Redes, 1935
- ¡Vámonos con Pancho Villa!, 1936
- Ferrocarriles de Baja California, 1938
  - Selections reworked as Música para charlar
- El indio, 1938
- Bajo el signo de la muerte, 1939
- Los de abajo, 1939
- La noche de los mayas (Night of the Mayas), 1939
- ¡Que viene mi marido!, 1940

== Songs ==
- "Duo para pato y canario", voice and chamber orchestra, 1931
- "Ranas" (Frogs) and "El tecolote" (The Owl), voice and piano, 1931
- "Caminando", 1937
- "Canto a una muchacha negra" (words by Langston Hughes), voice and piano 1938
- "Cinco canciones para niños y dos canciones profanas", 1938–39

== Piano ==
- Allegro
- Canción (a passage used also in Cuauhnáhuac)
