= Ventanas (Revueltas) =

1931 orchestral work by Silvestre Revueltas

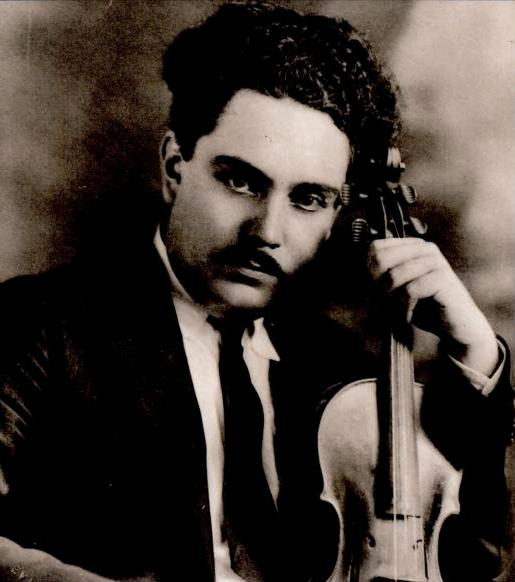
Silvestre Revueltas in 1930

Ventanas (Windows) is an orchestral work by the Mexican composer Silvestre Revueltas, written in 1931. A performance of it lasts about 11 minutes.

== History ==
Ventanas was Revueltas's third orchestral work, composed immediately after the first versions of Cuauhnáhuac and Esquinas, and concurrently with the second, large-orchestral version of Cuauhnáhuac and the Duo para Pato y Canario. It was completed in December 1931 and premiered on 4 November 1932 by the Orquesta Sinfónica de México under the composer's direction. Although not so indicated in the published score, Revueltas dedicated Ventanas to Ángela Acevedo, whom he married in the year of its premiere.

== Instrumentation ==
Ventanas is scored for an orchestra of piccolo, 2 flutes, 2 oboes, cor anglais, E♭ clarinet, 2 clarinets, bass clarinet, 2 bassoons, 4 horns, 4 trumpets, 3 trombones, tuba, timpani, percussion, and strings.

== Programmatic content ==
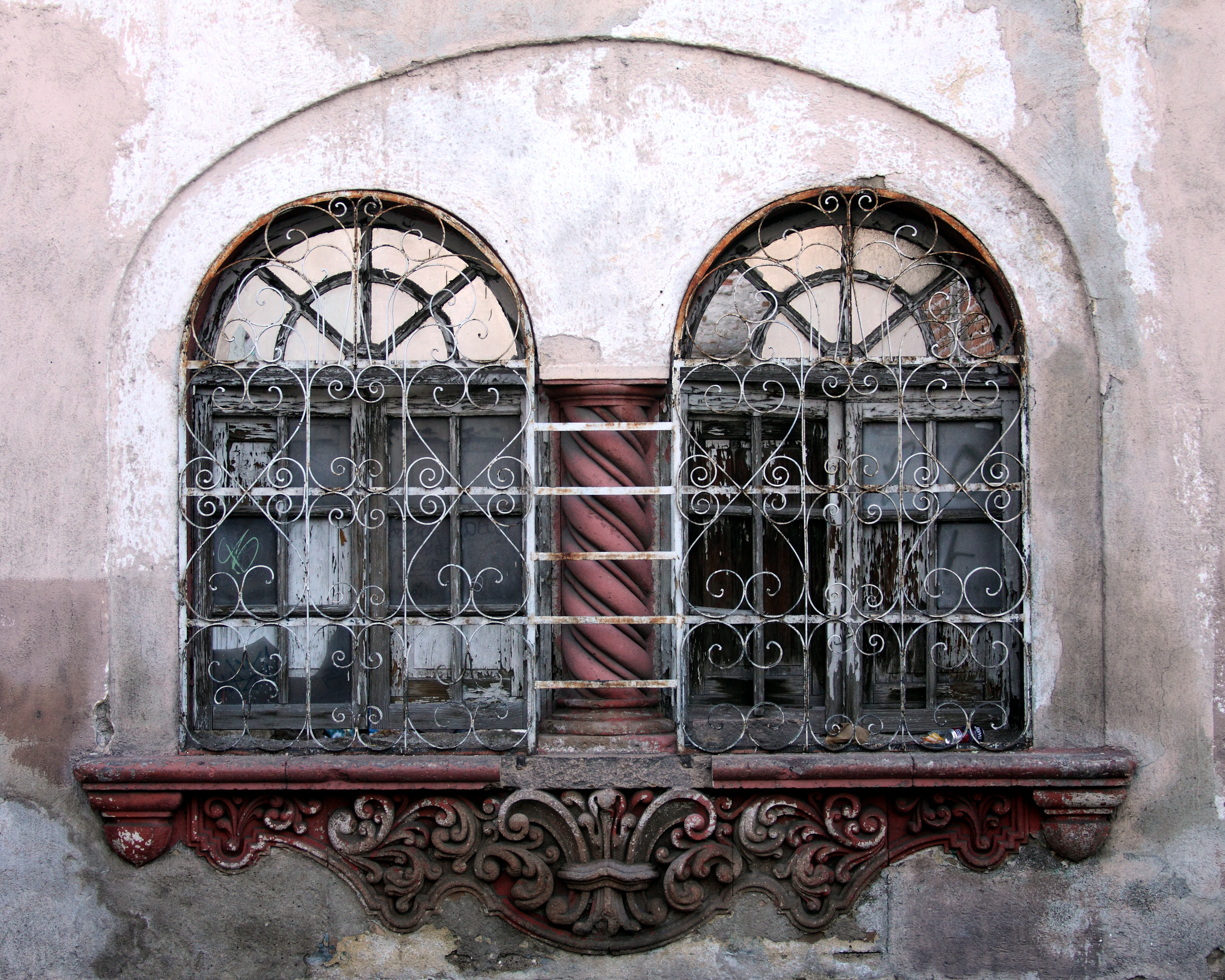
Mexican windows (ventanas)

In one programme note, Revueltas gave a rather conventional programmatic description: "Ventanas is sharply romantic music. Who does not remember a window by the light of the moon, or without it?" In another, better-known one, however, he demurred:

Ventanas is music that has no program. Perhaps, in writing this work, I thought of expressing some definite idea. Now, several months after writing it, I can't remember what it was.

The name doesn't mean anything; it might be called "Skylights" or anything else. (It all depends on the good or bad will of the listener.)

Nevertheless, a window does offer a fertile literary theme, and it might satisfy the taste of some persons who can neither understand nor listen to music without a program, without inventing something more or less disagreeable—but, fortunately, I am not a literary man.

I am a musician with technique and without inspiration.

== Analysis ==
Like Planos, Ventanas is exceptional among Revueltas's single-movement works in that it does not fall into a three-part structural pattern but rather is formally free and through-composed.

Ventanas, characteristic of Revueltas's style, employs pedal tones and ostinatos as bases for musical constructions which usually are accumulations of rhythms and instrumental textures. Broadly melodic sections contrast with others in which small motives are developed rhythmically. These fragmentary motives recall folk music, often as melodies in parallel thirds. The harmonic texture is mostly open rather than dense, despite chromatic melodic movement, and there are frequent hints of bitonality. Fifths and octaves anchor the strongly etched melodic contours and active harmonic rhythms. In the scoring, Revueltas displays a fondness for the low brass, especially the tuba, which also has a prominent role in many of Revueltas's other works, such as Sensemayá, Homenaje a Federico García Lorca, El renacuajo paseador, Troka, and Alcancías. Rhythmic complexity is also a feature, with constantly changing rhythms and meters. The music "never stands still (except when the composer intends so, always to maximum effect; these episodes are felt both as moments of melodic statement and rhythmic repose)."

== Reception ==
As an instance of Revueltas's harsher, more abstract, and modernist style Ventanas, as also Esquinas were poorly received by audiences, in contrast to his more lyrical and tonal examples, such as Colorines and Janitzio, were warmly praised.

On 8 September 1944, Aaron Copland wrote, in a letter to Arthur Berger from Tepoztlán, Mexico:

We are only two hours from Mexico City so I have heard the Sinfonica several times. Chavez played a piece of Revueltas' called Ventanas (Windows). Its very amusing to listen to—chuck full [sic] of orchestral color—but the form isn't very good, I'm afraid. He was like a modern painter who throws marvelous daubs of color on canvas that practically takes your eye out, but it doesn't add up. Too bad—because he was a gifted guy.

A 1999 review of Esa-Pekka Salonen's recording rates Ventanas somewhat higher, as a "minor masterpiece", in fact, describing it as cinematic and rhapsodic with primitive, ritualistic episodes recalling Sensemayá, but also with "delightful interludes in the Mexican folk style, a blues-tinged oboe theme, impassioned violins, and a drunken, orgiastic coda that builds to an appropriately festive climax".

The work has been interpreted as an example of Revueltas's representation of Mexican society, in which different cultural, ethnic, and social-class differences do not coexist peacefully, much less are brought into a harmonious or even dialectical synthesis. Although the music "sometimes clearly celebrates the plurality and vitality of Mexican society, the audible violence of the music, more openly in some pieces than in others, acknowledges clear conflicts among cultures and between premodern and modern social structures with their associated class configurations".

== Recordings ==
- Silvestre Revueltas: Ventanas; Lothar Klein: Musique à Go-Go. Louisville Orchestra, Robert Whitney, cond. LP recording, 1 disc: 33⅓ rpm, 12 in., stereo. Louisville First Edition Records LS-672. Louisville, KY: Louisville Orchestra Association, 1967.
- Silvestre Revueltas: La noche de los mayas; Caminos; Música para charlar; Ventanas. Orquesta Filarmónica de la Ciudad de México, Enrique Bátiz, cond. DDF LME-250. 1985.
- Silvestre Revueltas: Sensemayá; Ocho por radio; La noche de los mayas; Homenaje a Federico García Lorca; Ventanas; Dos pequeñas piezas serias. Los Angeles Philharmonic New Music Group, Esa-Pekka Salonen, cond. CD recording, 1 disc: digital, 4¾ in., stereo. Sony Classical SK 60676. [New York]: Sony Classical, 1999.
- Revueltas 2. Silvestre Revueltas: La noche de los mayas; Itinerarios; Ventanas; Caminos. Orquesta Sinfónica de Xalapa, Carlos Miguel Prieto, cond. Recorded 30 November 2006. CD recording, 1 disc: digital, 4¾ in., stereo. Urtext Digital Classics JBCC 150. México, D. F.: Urtext, 2007.
- Ventanas. Michael Kamen: Saxophone Concerto (arr. wind band by Zane Douglass); Malcolm Arnold: Water Music, Op. 82; Silvestre Revueltas: Ventanas (arr. wind band by Zane Douglass); Bruce Broughton: Celebration; Anthony Labounty: Salmo della rinascita. The UNLV Wind Orchestra, Thomas G. Leslie, cond. Recorded at Artemus Ham Concert Hall (except Arnold, recorded at Dr. Arturo Rando-Grillot Hall), April 2009 (Kamen) and March 2013. CD recording, 1 audio disc: digital, 4¾ in., stereo. Klavier Records KCD-11199. Klavier Records, 2014.
