= Planos (Revueltas) =

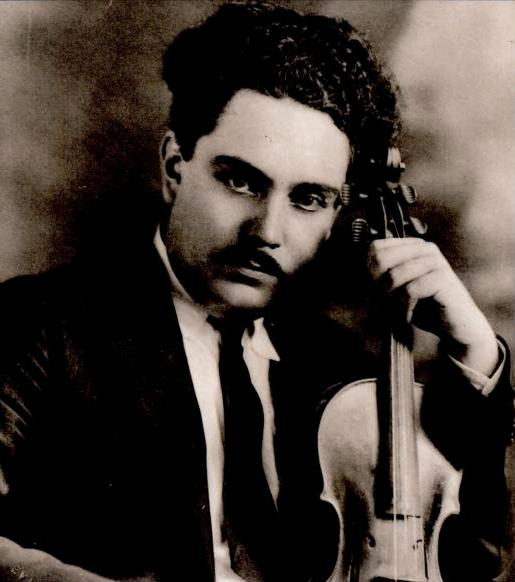
Silvestre Revueltas in 1930

Planos (Planes) is a chamber-music composition by the Mexican composer Silvestre Revueltas, also slightly enlarged and scored for full orchestra and published under its alternate title, Danza geométrica (Geometric Dance). Both versions were composed in 1934, and the scores are both dedicated to the architect Ricardo Ortega.

== History ==
From at least as early as 1926, the architect Ricardo Ortega had encouraged Revueltas to take his composing more seriously, and showed some of his early scores to Edgard Varèse. When, in 1934, Revueltas composed Planos with a structure clearly alluding to architectural models, he dedicated the score to his architect friend. Although Revueltas is often regarded as a Mexican nationalist with strong populist leanings, Planos contains no obvious reference to folklore. It is one of his purest musical works, in which the use of any folk-like musical elements is almost imperceptible. His references to geometry, though more programmatic than Varèse's, nevertheless indicate a kinship with the older composer's work in a shared overall linear character. Revueltas was certainly aware of Varèse's music and aesthetics in the 1920s, when the two composers had exchanged correspondence.

The chamber-music version was completed in March 1934, and was reorchestrated in June of the same year for full orchestra.

Revueltas described the work as

functional architecture, which does not exclude sentiment. Melodic fragments derive from the same impulse, the same emotion as my other works; they sing in persistent rhythms, ever in motion; they produce sonorities that may seem strange because they are not common. My rhythms and sonorities are reminiscent of other rhythms and sonorities, just as building material in architecture is identical with any building material, but it serves for constructions that are different in meaning, form, and expression.

== Instrumentation ==
The chamber version, published as Planos, is scored for a nonet: B♭ clarinet, B♭ bass clarinet, bassoon, C trumpet, piano, 2 violins, cello, and double bass. This heterogenous scoring, reminiscent of provincial bands, resembles those of other Revueltas scores, such as Alcancías and Colorines (both from 1932), Toccata sin Fuga (1933), and the slightly later Homenaje a Federico García Lorca.

The large-orchestra version, published as Danza geométrica, is scored for piccolo, 2 flutes, 2 E♭ clarinets, 2 B♭ clarinets, B♭ bass clarinet, 3 bassoons (3rd doubling contrabassoon), 4 horns, 4 trumpets, 3 trombones, tuba, percussion (4 players: xylophone, glockenspiel, large and small tamtams, bass drum, slapstick, cymbal, large gong, tambourine, and tubular bells), 2 pianos, and strings. The larger ensemble seems to have required a temporal expansion as well. Two sections in the first half are extended and rewritten with newly added melodic material, the return of the opening material at the end is recast, and occasional motivic repetitions are added throughout.

== Analysis ==
Planos departs from the ternary A–B–A form Revueltas habitually employed in single-movement works. Instead, it is freely structured and through-composed. It is constructed in modular, mosaic fashion from six generating motives, each with several variant forms. These motives are manipulated and juxtaposed, resulting in their continual re-contextualization. The identity of each of these motivic groups is intensified by the use of particular timbres, intensities, articulations, registers, melodic contours, meters, rhythmic patterns, and durations. Revueltas combines them into a whole through the use of sequencing, double and triple superimposition, stretto, fragmentation, extension, and shadowing, united by a complex design of ostinatos and rhythmic planes. The resulting musical discourse is often both flowing and abrupt, "a faithful mirror of the daily battle within the conflicting imagery of his inner and outer worlds".

When the influence of Igor Stravinsky on the orchestral version was suggested, the composer reacted:

It was performed last year. Opinion was divided. Some thought that it was Stravinsky; who knows what Stravinsky would have thought. Because it uses two pianos and some gongs, the chords at the beginning and end recall the sonority of the final chords of Les noces by Stravinsky; however, they are neither the same notes nor the same intervals, which probably bestows upon them an even stronger resemblance.

== Discography ==
=== Chamber version ===
- Silvestre Revueltas: Homenaje a Garcia Lorca; Planos, a Geometric Dance; Toccata sin fuga; Two Little Serious Pieces; Tres sonetos. MGM Chamber Orchestra, Carlos Surinach, cond. LP recording, 1 sound disc: 33⅓ rpm, monaural; 12 in. MGM E 3496. Pan-American Music Series. [N.p.]: MGM Records, 1956.
- Orquesta de la Universidad. Eduardo Mata: Improvisaciones no. 2, for 2 pianos and strings; Silvestre Revueltas: Planos; Ocho por radio; Rodolfo Halffter: Tres piezas para orquesta de cuerda. Homero Valle, Jorge Suárez, pianos (in the 1st work); Orquesta de la Universidad; Eduardo Mata, conductor. LP recording, 1 audio disc: analog, 33⅓ rpm, 12 in., stereo. RCA Red Seal MRL/S-001. México, D.F. : RCA Red Seal, 1970.
- Silvestre Revueltas: Musica de camara. Revueltas: Alcancías; El renacuajo paseador; Ocho por radio; Toccata sin fuga; Planos. London Sinfonietta, David Atherton, cond. Recorded November 1979, London. LP recording, 1 audio disc: analog, 33⅓ rpm, 12 in. stereo. RCA Victor MRS-019. Mexico, D.F.: RCA Victor, 1980. Reissued on Night of the Mayas: Music of Silvestre Revueltas. CD recording, 1 audio disc: digital, 4¾ in., stereo. Catalyst 09026-62672-2. [New York]: Catalyst, 1994.
- Homenaje a Revueltas. Silvestre Revueltas: Sensemayá; Ocho por radio; Planos (chamber version); Caminando; Este era un rey (arr. by Timothy McKeown); Hora de Junio; El renacuajo paseador; Pieza para doce instrumentos; Homenaje a Frederico García Lorca (arr. by The Ebony Band); José Pomar: Preludio y fuga rítmicos. Juan Carlos Tajes, reciter; Ebony Band, Amsterdam, Werner Herbers, cond.. Recorded November 2003, at Concert Hall, Tilburg, The Netherlands. SACD hybrid recording, 1 audio disc: digital, 4 ¾ in., multi-channel surround sound/stereo. Channel Classics CCS SA 21104. Herwijnen, Netherlands: Channel Classics, 2004.

=== Orchestral version ===
- Silvestre Revueltas: Música orquestal. New Philharmonia Orchestra of London; Eduardo Mata, conductor. Recorded November 1975 in Walthamstrow, London. LP recording, 2 sound discs: analog, 33⅓ rpm, stereo, 12 in. RCA Red Seal MRSA-1. Mexico, D.F.: RCA Red Seal, 1976. Reissued on Silvestre Revueltas, Centennial Anthology 1899–1999: 15 Masterpieces. CD recording, 2 audio discs: digital, 4¾ in., stereo. RCA Red Seal 09026-63548-2. New York: RCA Red Seal; México, D.F.: Conaculta, BMG, 1999.
