= Janitzio (Revueltas) =

1933 orchestral work by Silvestre Revueltas

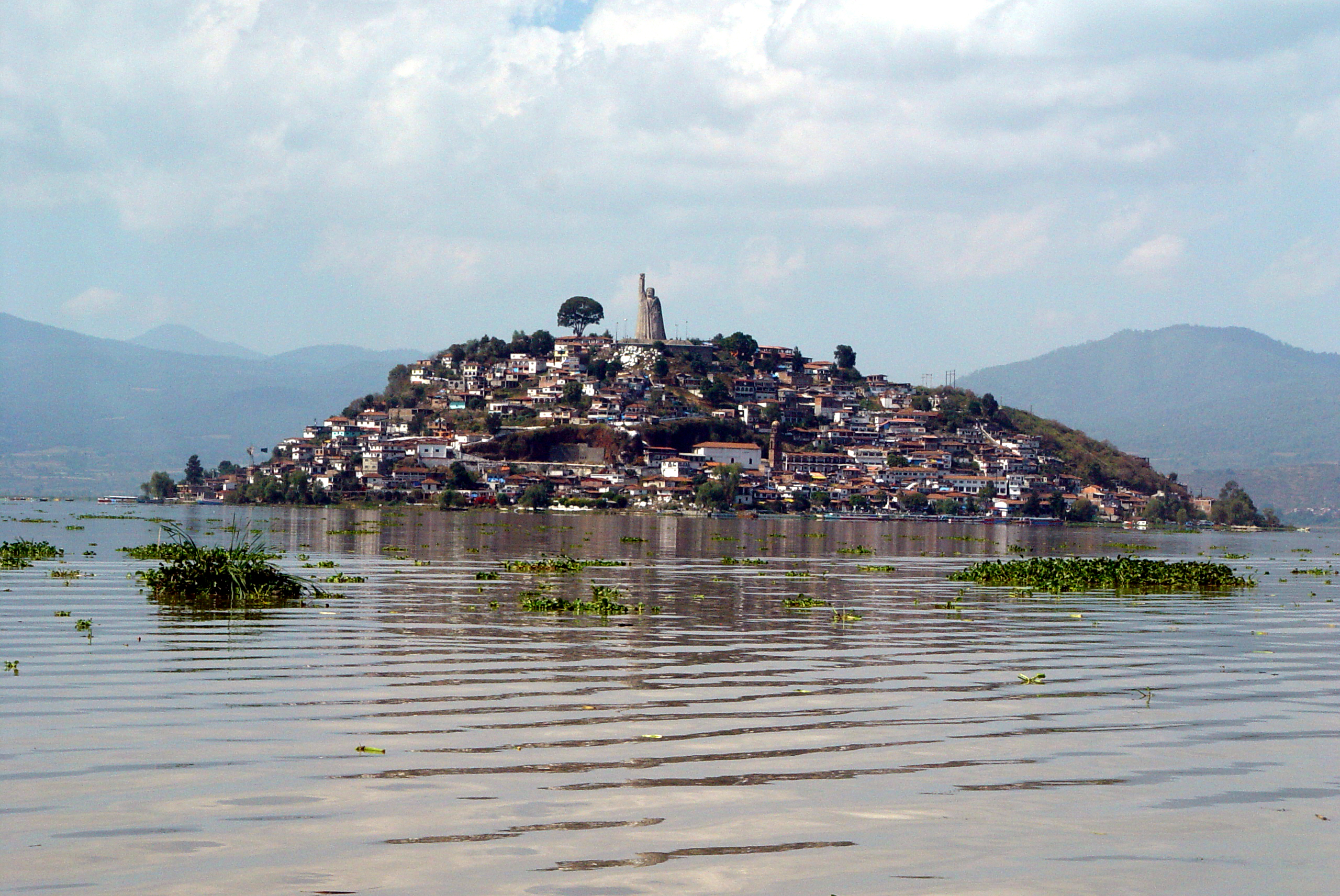
Janitzio Island in Lake Pátzcuaro

Janitzio is a symphonic poem by the Mexican composer Silvestre Revueltas, composed in 1933 and revised in 1936. A performance lasts about 15 minutes. The work is a portrait of Janitzio Island in Lake Pátzcuaro, Mexico.

== History ==
The score of Janitzio was completed on 31 July 1933 and was premiered under the composer's baton. According to some sources, this was by the Orquesta Sinfónica de México in the Teatro Hidalgo in Mexico City on 8 December 1933;( However, before it was unveiled to the audiences of the OSM, Revueltas had conducted it at the Palacio de Bellas Artes with the Orquesta del Conservatorio on 13 October 1933 in a program that also included Revueltas's own Ocho por radio, Daniel Ayala's Leyenda, and the first Mexican performance of Manuel Ponce's Canto y danza de los antiguos mexicanos.

According to one source, Revueltas originally composed the work for the film Janitzio, directed by Carlos Navarro and starring Emilio Fernández. However, this film, released in 1935, was produced after Revueltas's score had already been premiered, and the film's music is credited to Francisco Domínguez.

Revueltas revised the score three years later, completing the new version on 30 December 1936 at the Sanitorio Ramírez Moreno in Mexico City, where he was hospitalized for fatigue and rehabilitation from alcoholism. The original version was dedicated to Carlos Chávez and Armando Echevarría (librarian of the OSM), but Chávez and Revueltas fell out during the 1930s: the 1936 revised score bears no dedication.

== Programmatic content ==
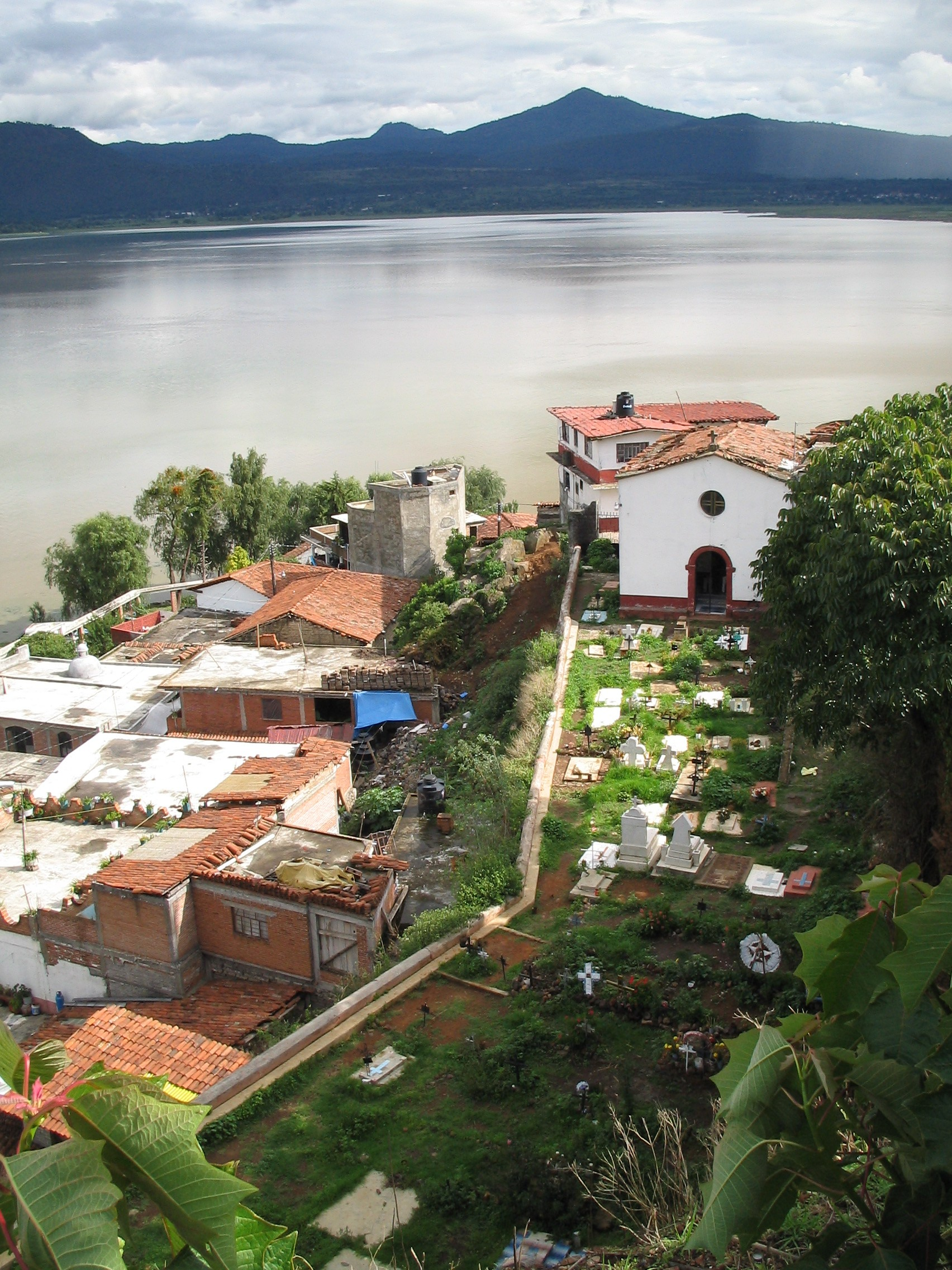
Lake Pátzcuaro and cemetery on Janitzio Island

Janitzio is a portrait of Janitzio Island in Lake Pátzcuaro, and is one of only two of Revueltas's works that refers directly to a Mexican landscape (the other is Cuauhnáhuac).

The composer wrote a short programme note on the work (in at least two versions):

Janitzio is a fishermen's [small] island in Lake Pátzcuaro. Lake Pátzcuaro stinks [is filthy]. Romantic [and sentimental] travelers have embellished it with verses and music of the picture-postcard type. Not to be outdone, I too add my grain of sand [in an infinite yearning for glory and renown]. Posterity will undoubtedly reward my contributions to tourism.

This note has been cited as an example of the composer's self-deprecating sarcasm. However, considering his leftist political views, these remarks might better be understood "as a reflection of his disdain for bourgeois consumerism, or as an attack on artistic production within a capitalist system".

== Instrumentation ==
The work is scored for piccolo, two flutes, two oboes, E♭ clarinet, B♭ clarinet, two bassoons, four horns, two trumpets, two trombones, tuba, suspended cymbal, side drum, bass drum, tamtam, and strings. The original 1933 version had only two horns, one trombone, and no violas; the side drum was to be played with the snares off, and the word "gong" appears instead of "tam-tam".

== Analysis ==
Janitzio follows the three-part structure that Revueltas favoured in all his orchestral works, with a lyrical, slow middle section. This has also been described, somewhat differently, as a "fast–slow–radiant" structure. The three sections are marked "Con brio" (b. 1–177), Lento espressivo (molto sostenuto e cantabile) (b. 177–238), and Tempo I (b. 239–386).

The lively opening employs certain melodic turns native to the region, which may have been modelled on a Purépecha son called "La Reina de los Huajiniguiles" (The Queen of the Huajiniguiles), from Uruaipán in the state of Michoacán. There are two main theme groups. The first is made up of three motivic cells, found in the first four bars and characterised principally by their rhythms, from which the entire work is generated: an ascending perfect fourth from E to A, a scale segment G♯–A–B–(C♯); and a descending major third from C♯–A. These plainly establish the key of A major. The second theme group (b. 89–138) is more compact than the first, and is primarily lyrical rather than rhythmic. It is not clear that this is actually a secondary thematic group as found in a sonata-allegro form. It is instead developmental in essence.

The middle section is contrasted by its simplicity, slower tempo, and 3/4 metre (though there are metrical variations throughout the section). It is features a lyrical, two-voiced theme, first presented by the clarinet and bassoon over an ostinato bass accompaniment. The key of G major is established by an insistent G pedal in the basses as well as by the tuba's dominant D at bar 183 and a dominant-tonic cadence at b. 190. The thematic development is continued from the previous section.

In the central part of the concluding section (between rehearsal numbers 28 and 29), Revueltas uses a "distortion" characteristic of his style. A waltz in A major evoking the atmosphere of 19th-century salon music is contradicted by a surrealistic presentation in the brass of a B♭-major arpeggio..

== Reception ==
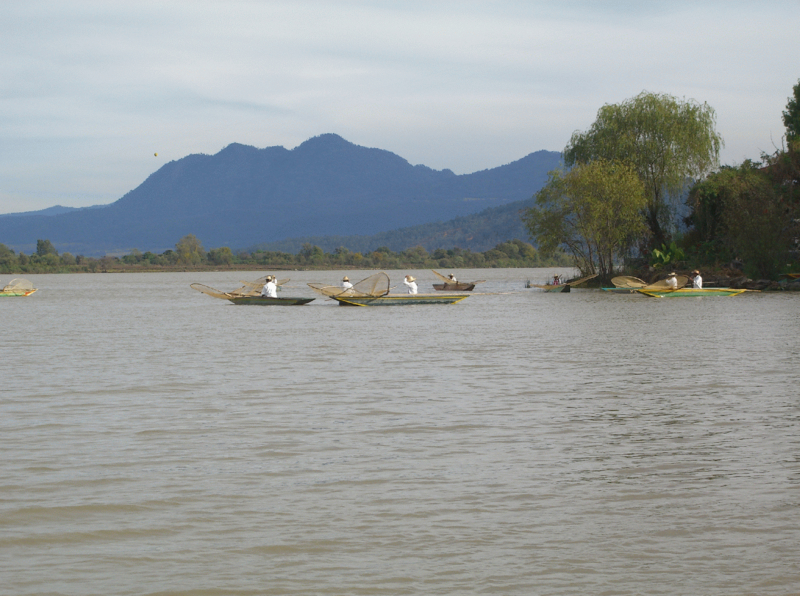
Butterfly-net fishing on Lake Pátzcuaro

From the outset, Janitzio was a great success with Mexican audiences and the press. One critic reported that the audience demanded that Janitzio be repeated. Another review of the premiere reported:

But the hero of the day was … Silvestre Revueltas. … his inspired composition “Janitzio,” which together with “Cuauhnáhuac” and “Colorines,” should be a reason for him to be proud, we cannot but express our enthusiasm. Besides its sheer aesthetic and aural beauty, “Janitzio” can very well stand as the expression of the most contrasting states that define the Mexican psyche: the romantic and sweet daydreaming, interrupted by the harsh and bitter reality; the joy that is, above all, abandon and a desire to forget, and the sad awakening. Perfect chord and no less perfect dissonance.

Janitzio was the epitome of the style of musical nationalism preferred by Mexican audiences, which was based on mestizo, popular elements, rather than on the pre-Columbian. Revueltas had by this time developed a style in which various, often disparate elements of the Mexican cultural soundscape were made to collide in audible violence: the popular, the modern, the urban, the peasant, the Indian, the military, the street life, the market, and the dance. Although the music sometimes celebrates the plurality and vitality of Mexican society, it also acknowledges clear cultural and societal conflicts. Whereas the harsher, more modernist examples of this style, such as Esquinas and Ventanas (both 1931) were given a cool welcome by audiences, more lyrical, milder examples, such as Colorines (1932) and Janitzio, were enthusiastically received. In fact, in the annual poll taken at the end of the 1933 OSM season Janitzio came in first place with 221 votes, ahead of even Ottorino Respighi’s Pines of Rome (210 votes), Igor Stravinsky’s Firebird Suite (198 votes), and Robert Schumann’s Piano Concerto (142 votes). This was in sharp contrast with Ventanas, which had received only 27 votes in the previous year's poll.

== Discography ==
- From the Bay of Naples. Renzo Rossellini, Songs from the Bay of Naples (suite dal balletto omonimo); Rossellini, Ninna Nanna (berceuse italiana, tratta dall'opera, La Guerra); Isaac Albéniz, Triana (from Iberia); Silvestre Revueltas Janitzio; Enrique Granados, Intermezzo (from Goyescas); Ernesto Lecuona La comparsa (Cuban dance); José White, La bella cubana. Columbia Symphony Orchestra; Efrem Kurtz, cond. LP recordind (monaural). Columbia CL-773. New York: Columbia Records, 1956.
- Silvestre Revueltas, Janitzio. Miguel Bernal Jiménez, Tres cartas de Mexico. Manuel M. Ponce, Ferial, divertimento sinfónico. Orquesta Sinfónica Nacional de México; José Ives Limantour, cond. LP recording (monaural). Serie INBA. Musart MCD 3015. Mexico: Discos Musart, 1958.
- Rolón, Galindo & Revueltas. José Rolón, Concerto for Piano and Orchestra; Blas Galindo, Sones de mariachi; Silvestre Revueltas, Janitzio. Miguel Garcia Mora, piano; Orquesta Sinfónica Nacional; Luis Herrera de la Fuente, cond. RCA MKL-1815 (monaural). MKS-1815 (stereo). México: RCA Victor, 1969.
- Silvestre Revueltas: Musica orquestal. (Sensemaya, Redes, Itinerarios, Caminos, Homenaje a Federico García Lorca, Danza geométrica, Cuauhnáhuac, Janitzio.) New Philharmonia Orchestra; Eduardo Mata, conductor. 2-LP set (stereo). RCA Victor MRSA-1. Mexico: RCA Victor, 1976. One disc reissued separately in the US as: Music of Revueltas. (Sensemayá, Redes, Caminos, Itinerarios, Janitzio). LP recording. RCA Red Seal ARL1-2320 (stereo). [United States]: RCA. Reissued on CD, with additional material, as Silvestre Revueltas: Antología orquestal y de cámara. Edición conmemorativa del centenario 1899–1999 / Revueltas: Centennial Anthology 1899–1999: 15 Masterpieces. 2-CD set. RCA Red Seal 09026-63548-2. Mexico: Conaculta-INBA; New York: BMG Entertainment, 1999.
- Musique mexicaine de Chávez, Revueltas, Villa-Lobos, Mabarak, Quintanar, Galindo, Halffter, Moncayo. Orquesta Filarmónica de la Ciudad de México; Fernando Lozano, cond. Recorded in the Sala Ollin Yoliztli, Mexico, September 1980 and October 1982. 2-CD set (stereo). Forlane UCD 16688 & 16689. [France]: UMIP, 1993.
- Music of Mexico, Vol. 3. Blas Galindo, Sones de mariachi; Rodolfo Halffter, Obertura festiva op. 21; Silvestre Revueltas, Janitzio and Cuauhnáhuac. Miguel Bernal Jiménez, Tres cartas de Mexico (Suite sinfónica). Orquesta Filarmónica de la Ciudad de México; Enrique Bátiz, cond. LP recording. EMI His Master's Voice ED 27–0229–1; [Hayes, Middlesex, England]: EMI His Master's Voice, 1985. Also issued on LP, Departamento del Distrito Federal 2702291. Mexico: Departamento del Distrito Federal, 1985. Reissued on CD, as part of Música mexicana Vol. 5, with other material: Antonio Soler (orch. Rodolfo Halffter), Tres sonatas; Silvestre Revueltas, Sensemayá; Manuel Ponce, "Estrellita"; Rodolfo Halffter, Tripartita; Silvestre Revueltas, Ocho por radio; Felipe Villanueva, Vals poetico; Dietrich Buxtehude (orch. Carlos Chávez), Chaconne in E minor. ASV CD DCA 894. London: Academy Sound and Vision, 1995. Also issued as Brilliant Classics 8771/5. [The Netherlands]: Brilliant Classics, 1995.
- Revueltas & Moncayo. Silvestre Revueltas: Sensemayá, Cinco canciones para niños, Janitzio, and Redes; José Pablo Moncayo: Tierra de temporal and Huapango. CD recording. Spartacus, Clásicos Mexicanos SDL21020. Irma González, soprano; Orquesta Filarmónica de la Ciudad de México; Gran Orquesta de la Radio de Leipzig (Tierra de temporal); Fernando Lozano, conductor. San Pedro de los Pinos, México: Spartacus, 1996.
- Danzón. Arturo Márquez, 'Danzón no. 2'; Javier Álvarez, Metro chabacano (string orchestra version); Marlos Nobre, Convergencias, op. 28; Dietrich Buxtehude (orch. Carlos Chávez), Chaconne in E minor; Silvestre Revueltas, Janitzio; Alejandro García Caturla, Tres danzas cubanas; Carlos Chávez, Chapultepec (Obertura republicana); Oscar Lorenzo Fernández, Batuque. Simón Bolívar Symphony Orchestra of Venezuela; Keri-Lynn Wilson, conductor. Recorded August 1997, Aula Magna of the Universidad Central de Venezuela, Caracas. CD recording. Dorian xCD-90254. Troy, N.Y.: Dorian, 1998.
- Sensemayá, Redes, Homenaje a Federico García Lorca, Janitzio, Música para charlar, Ocho por radio. Orquesta Sinfónica de Xalapa; Carlos Miguel Prieto, conductor. Recorded June 7–11, 2004, Teatro del Estado, Xalapa. [?format?cassette tape?] Urtext JBCC 088; Mexico: Urtext Records, 2004.
- Revueltas. Sensemayá, Redes, Homenaje a Federico García Lorca, Janitzio, Música para charlar, Ocho por radio. Neal Woolworth, trumpet; Orquesta Sinfónica de Xalapa; Carlos Miguel Prieto, cond. Recorded June 7–11, 2004, Teatro del Estado, Xalapa. CD recording (stereo). Urtext Records URT88. [Mexico]: Urtext Records, 2005.
