= Redes =

Redes may refer to:

- Redes Natural Park, Spain
- Redes (film), a 1936 Mexican film about a fishing community
- Redes (Revueltas), the score of the 1936 Mexican film
- Redes (TV series), a popular science program on Spanish TV presented by Eduard Punset
- Rodney Redes, Paraguayan footballer
