= String Quartet No. 3 (Revueltas) =

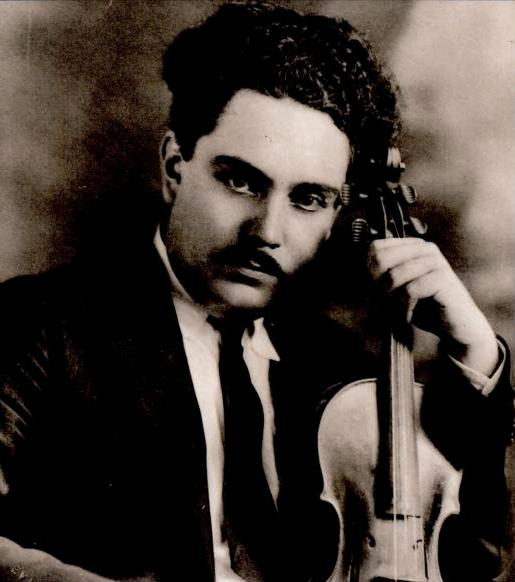
Silvestre Revueltas in 1930

String Quartet No. 3 is a chamber-music work written in 1931 by the Mexican composer and violinist Silvestre Revueltas.

Revueltas composed his third string quartet in the same year as his second, 1931, and the Cuarteto Clásico Nacional gave the first performance on 2 September 1931. Although the score was announced in 1958 as being "in preparation for sale," it was only finally published in 1995, fifty-five years after the composer's death and several decades after his other three quartets.

== Analysis ==
The quartet is in three movements:

1. Allegro con brio
2. Lento, misterioso y fantástico
3. Lento – Allegro

This work is regarded as "the best, most solid, and profound" of Revueltas's quartets. The second movement, marked "mysterious and ghostly", contains references to the third movement of Béla Bartók's Fourth Quartet, which was written just three years earlier.

== Discography ==
- Cuartetos de cuerda de Silvestre Revueltas. String Quartets 1–4. Cuarteto de Cuerdas Latinoamericano (Jorge Risi and Aron Bitrán, violins; Javier Montiel, viola; Alvaro Bitrán, cello). Recorded in the Sala Carlos Chávez, Centro Cultural Universitario, June 1984. LP recording, 1 disc: analog, 33⅓ rpm, stereo, 12 in. Voz Viva de México: Serie Música Nueva. México: Universidad Nacional Autónoma de México, 1984. Reissued as Silvestre Revueltas: Los cuartetos de cuerdas, second edition. LP recording, 1 disc: analog, 33⅓ rpm, stereo, 12 in. Voz Viva 337–338. Serie Música nueva MN-22. [Mexico City]: Voz Viva, 1987.
- Silvestre Revueltas. Música de feria: The String Quartets/los cuartetos de cuerda. Quartet No. 1; Quartet No. 2, Magueyes; Quartet No. 3; Quartet No. 4: Música de feria. Cuarteto Latinoamericano. Recorded April 9–10, 1993, at the Carnegie Free Library, Carnegie, Pennsylvania. New Albion NA062CD. Classical Music Library. San Francisco: New Albion Records, 1993. Reissued as Revueltas String Quartets Nos. 1–4. Hong Kong: Naxos Digital Services Ltd., [2009], streaming audio (online resource).
- Martínez Bourguet String Quartet Plays Silvestre Revueltas. String Quartets 1–3 and Música de feria. Martínez Bourguet String Quartet (Pablo Arturo Martínez Bourguet and Ekaterine Martínez Bourguet, violins; Alessia Martínez Bourguet, viola; César Martínez Bourguet, cello). Recorded in the summer of 2006 in the Sala Carlos Chávez, Universidad Nacional Autónoma de México. CD recording, 1 disc: digital, 4¾ in., stereo. MB Producciones [s.n.]. [Mexico]: MB Producciones, 2007.
