= String Quartet No. 1 (Revueltas) =

Mexican composer and violinist Silvestre Revueltas

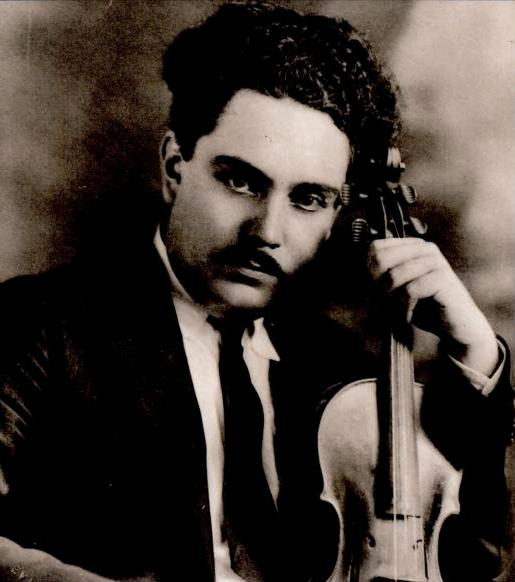
Silvestre Revueltas in 1930

String Quartet No. 1 by the Mexican composer and violinist Silvestre Revueltas was composed in 1930. The string quartet is dedicated to Carlos Chávez.

== Analysis ==
The quartet is in two movements:

1. Allegro energico
2. Vivo

The first movement is regarded by one analyst as not following any conventional formal scheme, consisting instead of a series of contrasting episodes in different tempos and frequently changing meters that is similar to the Italian canzonas of the late-sixteenth and early seventeenth centuries. According to another view, it is in a ternary, ABA form, which conflicts with the expected sonata-allegro form of the traditional string quartet. The outer sections are fast, rhythmically irregular, loud, and aggressive, while the middle section contrasts with a slower tempo (Lento), regular rhythms, soft dynamics, and a lyrical, tender mood. The first section falls into four subsections (Allegro energico, Poco meno mosso – cantabile, Tempo I, and Meno mosso), each marked at the end by sustained chords, grand pauses, or both. The fourth subsection is a modified repetition of the second. The chromatic harmonies of the slow, B section are reminiscent of the slow passages in the String Quartet and Lyric Suite of Alban Berg. The concluding Allegro is a nearly literal repetition of just the third subsection from the first part of the movement.

The second movement is in the same fast-slow-fast ternary pattern as the first, but the two A sections are identical and divided into just two subsections. The slow middle section, unlike its counterpart in the first movement, is characterised by ostinato patterns and an eerie mood. Its metrical regularity contrasts sharply with the erratic rhythms of the outer, A sections.

== Recordings ==
In chronological order of recording.

- Cuartetos de cuerda de Silvestre Revueltas. String Quartets 1–4. Cuarteto de Cuerdas Latinoamericano (Jorge Risi and Aron Bitrán, violins; Javier Montiel, viola; Alvaro Bitrán, cello). Recorded in the Sala Carlos Chávez, Centro Cultural Universitario, June 1984. LP recording, 1 disc: analog, 33⅓ rpm, stereo, 12 in. Voz Viva de México: Serie Música Nueva. México: Universidad Nacional Autónoma de México, 1984. Reissued as Silvestre Revueltas: Los cuartetos de cuerdas, second edition. LP recording, 1 disc: analog, 33⅓ rpm, stereo, 12 in. Voz Viva 337–338. Serie Música nueva MN-22. [Mexico City]: Voz Viva, 1987.
- Silvestre Revueltas. Música de feria: The String Quartets/los cuartetos de cuerda. Quartet No. 1; Quartet No. 2, Magueyes; Quartet No. 3; Quartet No. 4: Música de feria. Cuarteto Latinoamericano. Recorded April 9–10, 1993, at the Carnegie Free Library, Carnegie, Pennsylvania. New Albion NA062CD. Classical Music Library. San Francisco: New Albion Records, 1993. Reissued as Revueltas String Quartets Nos. 1–4. Hong Kong : Naxos Digital Services Ltd., [2009], streaming audio (online resource).
- Martínez Bourguet String Quartet Plays Silvestre Revueltas. String Quartets 1–3 and Música de feria. Martínez Bourguet String Quartet (Pablo Arturo Martínez Bourguet and Ekaterine Martínez Bourguet, violins; Alessia Martínez Bourguet, viola; César Martínez Bourguet, cello). Recorded in the summer of 2006 in the Sala Carlos Chávez, Universidad Nacional Autónoma de México. CD recording, 1 disc: digital, 4¾ in., stereo. MB Producciones [s.n.]. [Mexico]: MB Producciones, 2007.
