= Música de feria =

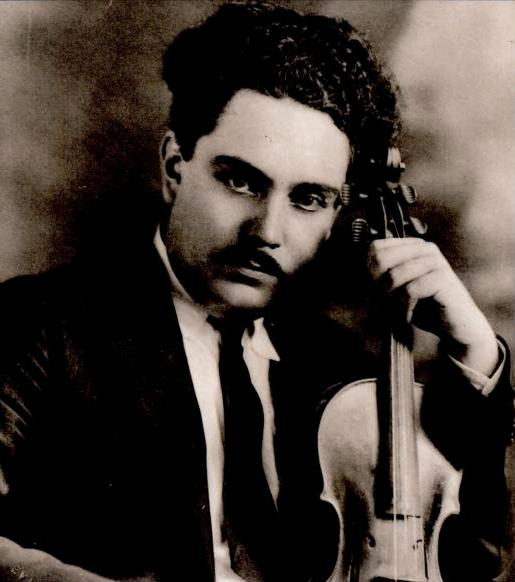
Silvestre Revueltas in 1930

Música de feria (Fair Music) is a composition for string quartet by the Mexican composer and violinist Silvestre Revueltas, written in 1932. Though not so titled by the composer, it is sometimes referred to as his String Quartet No. 4. A performance lasts a little more than nine minutes.

== History ==
Música de feria was completed on 25 March 1932 and first performed on 7 November 1933 by the Cuarteto Clásico (violinists Ezequiel Sierra and David Saloma, violist David Elizarrarás, and cellist Teófilo Ariza) at the Teatro Hidalgo in Mexico City. Revueltas had previously composed three numbered quartets in rapid succession in 1930–31, but this work was only first designated his String Quartet No. 4 in 1984, by the Cuarteto Latinoamericano and Juan Arturo Brennan. It is regarded as one of Revueltas's most important works. Of his four quartets, Música de feria is without question the one that has most often been performed and recorded.

== Analysis ==
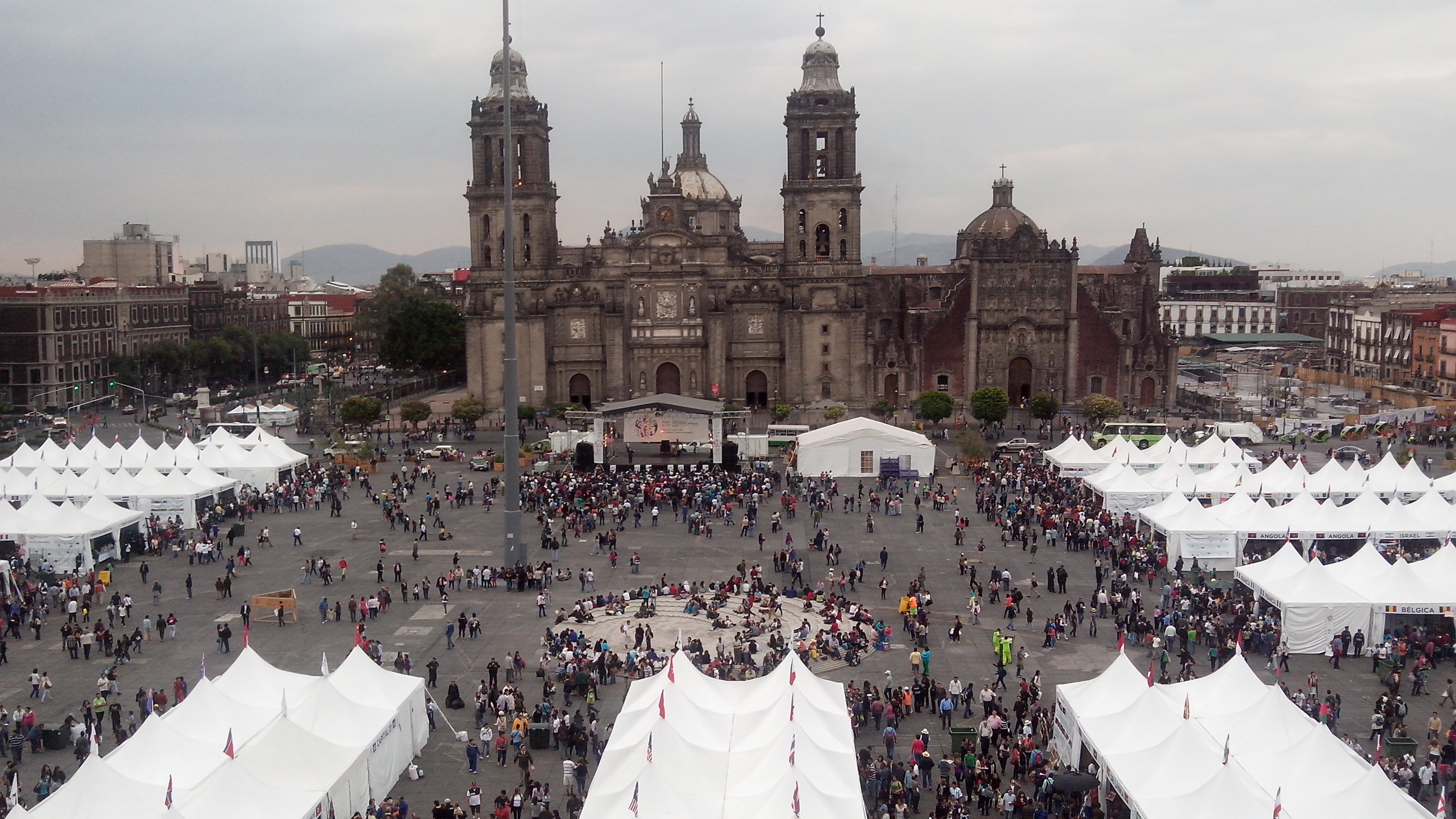
Fair at the Plaza de la Constitución, Mexico City

Música de feria is written in a single movement which nevertheless incorporates the structure and development of a traditional quartet. A distinctive feature is the simultaneous presentation of independent melodic lines in each part but within a single rhythmic pattern.

There is considerable disagreement about the musical structure.

According to one interpretation, the quartet is seen as clearly falling into four main sections, corresponding in miniature to the structure of a traditional four-movement string quartet: Allegro (first movement), Lento (slow movement), Allegro giocoso (scherzo), and Allegro tempo I (finale).

Alternatively, the quartet is regarded as falling into just three large sections, each of which consists of a succession of three contrasting subsections. The opening section (Allegro–Vivo allegro) returns in slightly modified form at the end, thereby forming an overall ABC–DEF–ABC pattern. The central section is marked at its onset (D) by a slow tempo (Lento) employing ostinato patterns, but this gives way to increasingly faster material in the second and third subsections (E and F, Allegro tempo I and Giocoso, respectively). The recurrence of the opening section is almost literal in its A and B subsections, with the C section in an accelerated tempo, Presto y frenético.

== Discography ==
In chronological order of recording.

- Cuartetos de cuerda de Silvestre Revueltas. String Quartets 1–4. Cuarteto de Cuerdas Latinoamericano (Jorge Risi and Aron Bitrán, violins; Javier Montiel, viola; Alvaro Bitrán, cello). Recorded in the Sala Carlos Chávez, Centro Cultural Universitario, June 1984. LP recording, 1 disc: analog, 33⅓ rpm, stereo, 12 in. Voz Viva de México: Serie Música Nueva. México: Universidad Nacional Autónoma de México, 1984. Reissued as Silvestre Revueltas: Los cuartetos de cuerdas, second edition. LP recording, 1 disc: analog, 33⅓ rpm, stereo, 12 in. Voz Viva 337–338. Serie Música nueva MN-22. [Mexico City]: Voz Viva, 1987.
- Cuarteto de Cuerdas Latinoamericano. Silvestre Revueltas: Música de feria; Rodolfo Halffter: Ocho tientos para cuarteto de cuerdas; Julián Carrillo: Dos piezas para cuarteto de cuerdas; Arturo Márquez: Ron-dó. Cuarteto Latinoamericano. LP recording, 1 disc: analog, 33⅓ rpm, 12 in. Colección Hispano mexicana de música contemporánea 4. Mexico, D.F.: CIIM, 1986.
- Silvestre Revueltas, Alberto Ginastera, Heitor Villa-Lobos: String Quartets/Cuartetos para cuerdas. Revueltas: Música de feria and Quartet no. 2 (Magueyes); Ginastera, Quartet no. 1, Op. 20; Villa-Lobos: Quartet no. 17. Cuarteto Latinoamericano. Recorded October 1988 in Carnegie Free Library Concert Hall, Carnegie, Pennsylvania. CD recording, 1 disc: digital, stereo, 4¾ in. Élan CD 2218. Adelphi, Maryland: Élan, 1989. Revueltas and Villa-Lobos reissued as part of Latin American String Quartets. Heitor Villa-Lobos: String Quartets Nos. 5 and 17; Silvestre Revueltas: Música de feria; Julián Orbón: String Quartet; Mario Lavista: Reflejos de la noche. Cuarteto Latinoamericano (Saúl Bitrán and Arón Bitrán, violins; Javier Montiel, viola; Alvaro Bitrán, violoncello). Orbón and Villa-Lobos Quartet No. 5 recorded March 1990 in Carnegie Free Library Concert Hall, Carnegie, Pennsylvania. CD recording, 1 disc: digital, 4¾ in. Riverdale, Maryland: Élan Recordings, 2001.
- Música de feria: String Quartets from Mexico, Brazil, Chile and Spain. Revueltas: Música de feria; Villa-Lobos: Quartet No. 6; Turina: La oración del torero; Orrego-Salas: String Quartet No. 1. The Helios String Quartet (Krzysztof Zimowski and Jonathan Armerding, violins; Willy Sucre, viola; Adam González, cello). Recorded July 1992, Simms Auditorium, Albuquerque Academy, New Mexico. CD recording, 1 disc: digital, 4¾ in., stereo. UBIK Sound UB 20. Albuquerque: UBIK Sound, 1993.
- Silvestre Revueltas. Música de feria: The String Quartets/los cuartetos de cuerda. Quartet No. 1; Quartet No. 2, Magueyes; Quartet No. 3; Quartet No. 4: Música de feria. Cuarteto Latinoamericano. Recorded April 9–10, 1993, at the Carnegie Free Library, Carnegie, Pennsylvania. New Albion NA062CD. Classical Music Library. San Francisco: New Albion Records, 1993. Reissued as Revueltas String Quartets Nos. 1–4. Hong Kong: Naxos Digital Services Ltd., [2009], streaming audio (online resource).
- Tear. Astor Piazzolla, Libertango (arr. Jeremy Cohen); Ruth Crawford Seeger, "Andante" from the String Quartet; Ronald Bruce Smith, "Corrente" from Quartet No. 2, "Nostalgia"; Gabriela Ortiz, String Quartet No. 1; John Harbison, "Fantasia" from String Quartet No. 2; Silvestre Revueltas, Musica de feria; Keeril Makan, Tear; Adriana Isabel Figueroa Mañas, "Audacious Tango" from Tangoimpressions; Lou Harrison, "Variations on a Song of Palestine" from String Quartet Set; Earle Brown, String Quartet; Alberto Ginastera, "Libero e rapsódico" from String Quartet No. 2; Del Sol String Quartet, Crack (improvisation). Del Sol String Quartet (Kate Stenberg and Aenea Mizushima Keyes, violins; Charlton Lee, viola; Randy Fromme, cello). Recorded May 2002 at APG Studios, San Francisco. CD recording, 1 disc: digital, stereo, 4¾ in. Del Sol String Quartet 5637270277. [San Francisco?]: Del Sol String Quartet, 2003.
- Martínez Bourguet String Quartet Plays Silvestre Revueltas. String Quartets 1–3 and Música de feria. Martínez Bourguet String Quartet (Pablo Arturo Martínez Bourguet and Ekaterine Martínez Bourguet, violins; Alessia Martínez Bourguet, viola; César Martínez Bourguet, cello). Recorded in the summer of 2006 in the Sala Carlos Chávez, Universidad Nacional Autónoma de México. CD recording, 1 disc: digital, 4¾ in., stereo. MB Producciones [s.n.]. [Mexico]: MB Producciones, 2007.
- Candybox: String Quartet "Sweets" from Bartók to Jenkins. Béla Bartók, Valse (Ma mie qui danse), arr. Sándor Devich; Vladimír Godár, Ground, from Concerto grosso per archi e cembalo, arr. Gene Carl; Karl Jenkins, String Quartet no. 2; Chiel Meijering, Caixa de dolços; Silvestre Revueltas, Música de feria; Josef Suk, Meditation Svatý Václave, Op. 35; Joaquín Turina, Serenata, Op. 87. Matangi Quartet (Maria-Paula Majoor and Daniel Torrico Menacho, violins; Karsten Kleijer, viola; Arno van der Vuurst, cello; with Zita Mikijanska, harpsichord, in the Godár work). Recorded 29 June – 3 July 2009 at FWL Studios, Leipzig. CD recording, 1 disc: digital, stereo. CD recording, 1 disc: digital, stereo, 4¾ in. Challenge Classics 72353. [Hilversum, The Netherlands]: Challenge Classics, 2010.
