= Otto Mayer-Serra =

Spanish-Mexican musicologist (1904–1968)

Otto Mayer-Serra (1904 in Barcelona, Spain – 1968 in Mexico City), was a Spanish-Mexican musicologist known for being one of the first musicologist to write a systematic study of 20th century Mexican music.

== Life ==
His father was a German of Jewish origin. He was later adopted by the Spanish family Serra in 1934 when he became Spanish citizen. Mayer-Serra studied music in Barcelona, although his music education came from the German and French school. While living in Barcelona, he became a music critic and during the Spanish Civil War he worked in the music department for the support of the Generalitat. In 1937 his Cancionero Revolucionario Internacional (International and revolutionary Songbook) was published, in which he collected many revolutionary songs of the time by composers such as Silvestre Revueltas and Rodolfo Halffter. He joined the music magazine Música, which had important support from the official Spanish government. There he published the first Spanish articles on the concept of Sociomusicology, En torno de una Sociología de la Música. Along with Rodolfo Halffter he suffered the bombing of Figueras, where he lost part of his work. During that period he wrote in other magazines like Hora de España.

In 1939 he moved to Mexico. There he worked as musicologist and music critic in the journal Últimas Novedades and in the magazine Tiempo as well as in programming concerts. He was artistic director of the Orquesta de Jalapa. One of his first writings was Silvestre Revueltas, su vida y su obra (Silvestre Revueltas, his life and work) was published in the magazine Hoy in Mexico City. Música y músicos de Latinoamérica (Music and musicians of Latin America) became his most important work and is one of the leading source for Latin American music studies.

== Sources ==
- Casares, Emilio. Diccionario de la Música Española e Hispanoamericana. Sociedad general de autores y editores.
- “From the People to the People: The Reception of Hanns Eisler’s Critical Theory of Music in Spain through the Writings of Otto Mayer-Serra”, in: Musicologica Austriaca. Journal for Austrian Music Studies (Österreichsische Gesellschaft für Musikwissenschaft). http://www.musau.org/parts/neue-article-page/view/76
- “Ludwig van Beethoven y el materialismo dialéctico en la historiografía musical marxista de Otto Mayer-Serra (1933–1939)”, in: Beethoven ibérico. Dos siglos de transferencia cultural. Ed. Teresa Cascudo (Granada: Comares, 2021), 287–301.
