= La noche de los mayas (Revueltas) =

1939 film score by Silvestre Revueltas

La noche de los mayas is a film score by the Mexican composer Silvestre Revueltas for the 1939 film of the same name, Revueltas's score consists of 36 sequences without any organic relation to one another, composed to be easily fitted to an already-edited film.

After Revueltas' death in 1940, the film score was arranged for performance in the concert hall. There are at least two such arrangements, that of the German composer Paul Hindemith and that of the Mexican conductor José Yves Limantour. Both arrangers feature percussion sections which relate to Mexico's pre-Columbian heritage, but Limantour altered Revueltas' score extensively.

== Concert suites ==
=== Hindemith ===
In 1946 the German composer Paul Hindemith made a visit to Mexico where he met Rosaura Revueltas, sister of Silvestre. This led to his concert arrangement in two movements. Hindemith's version calls for a small orchestra consisting of:

- 2 flutes (both doubling piccolo)
- 1 oboe
- 2 clarinets
- 1 bassoon
- 4 horns
- 1 trumpet
- 1 trombone
- 1 tuba
- timpani
- percussion (tamtam, bass drum, cymbals, indian drum, maracas, güiro, xylophone)
- strings

=== Limantour ===
In 1959, Mexican conductor José Yves Limantour made a four-movement suite from La noche de los Mayas. In this version, Limantour "took every imaginable liberty", including the addition of a concluding, extended "improvisation" of exotic percussion instruments which is largely responsible for the music's success with audiences, who erroneously believe it to have been composed by Revueltas himself.

1. "Noche de los mayas", molto sostenuto
2. "Noche de jaranas", scherzo
3. "Noche de Yucatán", andante espressivo
4. "Noche de encantamiento", tema y variaciones

It was premiered on 30 January 1961 by the Guadalajara Symphony Orchestra. It is scored for larger forces than Hindemith's version.

- 2 flutes (both doubling piccolo)
- 2 oboes
- 2 clarinets (both doubling E♭ clarinet)
- 1 bass clarinet
- 2 bassoons
- 4 horns
- 3 trumpet
- 2 trombones
- 1 tuba
- 1 piano
- timpani
- percussion (12 players: bongos, conga, metal rattle (sonajes), güiro, 2 tom-toms, teponaxtles, bass drum (huehuetl), caracol, snare drum, tenor drum, Indian drum, suspended cymbal, tamtam, xylophone)
- strings

(Limantour's manuscript specifies 14 percussionists, but includes amongst them the timpani and piano.)

Aware of the fact that Limantour's score specifies a percussion "improvisation" in the finale, more recent conductors such as Esa-Pekka Salonen, Enrique Diemecke, and Gustavo Dudamel have ignored Limantour's written-out version and substituted their own "improvisations", often to better effect.

== Recordings ==
A suite from the score was recorded by RCA with the Orquesta Sinfónica de Xalapa, conducted by Luis Herrera de la Fuente.

The version by Hindemith was recorded by the Tempus Fugit Orquesta conducted by Christian Gohmer, and released by Quindecim Records in 2014.

The version by José Limantour was recorded by the Orquesta Sinfónica Simón Bolívar, conducted by Gustavo Dudamel and released on Deutsche Grammophon in 2010. Earlier, in 1959, Limantour had himself recorded his arrangement, conducting the Orquesta Sinfónica de Guadalajara. This was made around the time Limantour's arrangement was first performed.
