= Esquinas =

1933 composition by Silvestre Revueltas

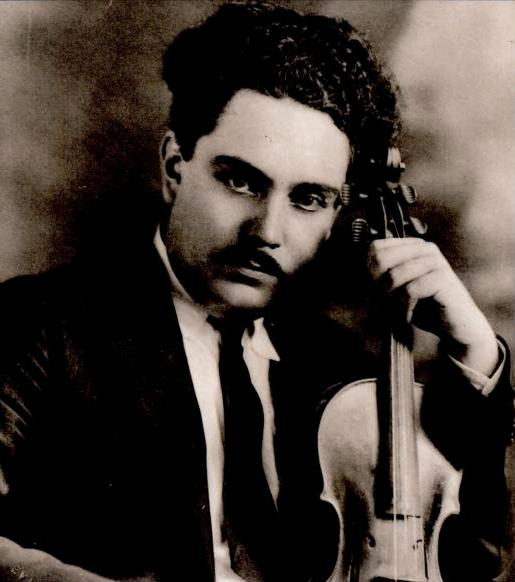
Silvestre Revueltas in 1930

Esquinas (Corners) is an orchestral composition by the Mexican composer Silvestre Revueltas, written in 1931 and extensively revised in 1933. The first version is in two movements with a duration of about 11 minutes in performance; the second is variously described as being in one or in three (continuous) movements with a total duration of about seven minutes. The scores of both versions are dedicated to Ángela Acevedo.

== History ==
Esquinas was originally composed in 1931, in two movements and scored for chamber orchestra with a soprano voice in the first movement. According to one source, a version of Esquinas for orchestra alone was premiered on 20 November 1931 by the Orquesta Sinfónica de México under the composer's baton. Two years later, in October 1933, Revueltas decided to make a new version of Esquinas. The second version is more compact, less repetitive, without abandoning the collage-form structure of short episodes. The two final movements are combined into one, and several orchestrational problems of the original version are corrected or improved. This abbreviated version is regarded as either a single-movement composition, or as broken into three movements.

The composer's note for Esquinas reads:

From every street and every neighborhood. Listeners would probably be hard pressed to imagine themselves in a corner. Me too. With good will you can imagine anything: streets, alleys, squares, plazas. It would be fun to find in this music noise of horns, trams, trucks and so on. Unfortunately there is nothing like that. (At least, naively, I think so.) Rather there is noise or silence, the internal traffic of souls that I see passing by near me. Some music connoisseurs are able to find a determinate form in this music—binary, ternary, lied. This was not my intention. The traffic I was talking about has multiple shapes and no apparent coherence. It is subject to the rhythm of life, not to the distance from one side of the street to the other. I have nothing to say about the technique behind the music because it doesn't interest me. Some good-humoured people say I have technique; other, bad-tempereded ones, say I do not. They ought to know better.

Yesterday's corners with today's emotion, observed from other roads of the heart with a new perspective, more understanding, more faithful, more experienced; modeled with new material, leaving intact their tortured anguish of fettered aspirations, their persistent pain stuck in the middle of the street, the harrowing cry of the poor and helpless vendor, fruitful in a defiance that now feels a little strange within the encouraging optimism of my present desire, happy and strong as a whole mountain of new energy and new hope. There remains only the substance of these tumultuous corners that retain the noise of the crowds' struggle, their bitter taste of heartbreak and the hard consistency of the people, forged in all their sorrows.

== Instrumentation ==
The first version of Esquinas is unpublished and details of the scoring are unknown. The second version is scored for a chamber orchestra which, according to the manuscript of the score held by the Free Library of Philadelphia (Fleisher Collection), consists of piccolo, 2 flutes, 2 oboes, cor anglais, E♭ clarinet, 2 clarinets, bass clarinet, 2 bassoons, 4 horns, 4 trumpets, 3 trombones, tuba, timpani, percussion (including xylophone), and strings. The publisher's (Peer International) website gives a slightly different instrumentation: 3 flutes (third doubling piccolo), 2 oboes, cor anglais, E♭ clarinet, 2 clarinets, bass clarinet, 4 horns, D trumpet, 4 trumpets, 3 trombones, tuba, timpani, percussion (2 Indian drums, xylophone, ch, bass drum, suspended cymbal, woodblock, tamtam, triangle, jingles, güiro), harp, and strings.

== Analysis ==
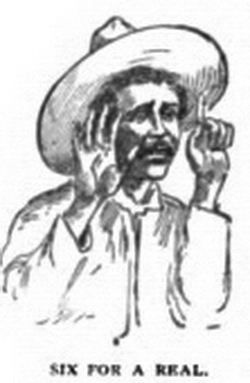
Street vendor

The original version of Esquinas consists of three movements, the second and third of which are played without a break:

1. Lento sostenuto — Allegro moderato ma agitato — Andante — Vivo — Lento sostenuto
2. Allegretto
3. Allegro

Esquinas offers an early example of Revueltas's Mexican popular-musical modernism, "whose themes are shattered at the moment of their birth, a struggle that does not permit its features to be heard emerging, decomposed, barely sketched and acclimated". In the second version of the work, Revueltas discarded the vocal part in the first movement of the original. Although it is difficult to be certain about the composer's reasoning, it was most likely a purely practical consideration. There are several difficulties with the part. First, it comes to only 24 bars in all, consisting of four very short, widely separated outbursts. Second, the required registers exceed the normal range of a typical vocal tessitura, creating problematic technical difficulties. Third, the actual function of the singer is not clear: is she a soloist, or should she be regarded as a sort of "supplemental instrument" in the orchestra? In turn, where should the singer be placed on the stage, and how should the melodies be sung, since there are no words and the composer has provided no indication for vocalization? It has been suggested that the soprano voice may represent the score's dedicatee, Ángela Acevedo, with whom Revueltas had been living since 1930 and would marry in 1932, and to whom he also dedicated the scores of Ventanas, Parián, and Caminos.

The presence of a vocal part in the first version, however, suggests "In a direct and very natural way, the evocation of the sung street cry leads to the interpretation of two other cries of Esquinas, which call attention to themselves because, among other reasons, they are enunciated by a female voice. The unusual way of incorporating the voice (since she is neither a soloist, nor is part of the orchestra, and her participation is brief and sporadic) appears to be explained by its communicative function serving the composer to highlight or underline certain musical elements he considered significant".

It has been proposed that the musical construction of Esquinas is based on the cries of Mexican street vendors who once populated the urban landscape. Revueltas does not quote actual street cries, but rather imitates certain of their stereotypical aspects. The incorporation of these characteristic features merely suggests a semantic marking, enabling or enhancing their identification as a musical sign of cultural origin.

== Reception ==
As an instance of Revueltas's harsher, more abstract, and modernist style, Esquinas was poorly received by audiences initially, in contrast to his more lyrical and tonal works, such as Colorines and Janitzio. Esquinas, in either of its two versions, has remained one of Revueltas's least-performed works, and the first recording was released only in 2004.

== Discography ==
- Silvestre Revueltas: Obra orquestal inédita/Unknown Orchestral Works. Esquinas (1931 version); Esquinas (1933 version); Redes (original concert versions); Toccata sin fuga. Encarnación Vázquez, mezzo-soprano; Román Revueltas, violin; Orquesta Sinfónica de la Universidad de Guanajuato, José Luis Castillo, cond. Recorded August 2002, in the Auditorio del Estado de la Ciudad de Guanajuato. CD recording, 1 audio disc: 12 cm, stereo. Quindecim QP-123. México: Quindecim Recordings, 2004.
