= String Quartet No. 2 (Revueltas) =

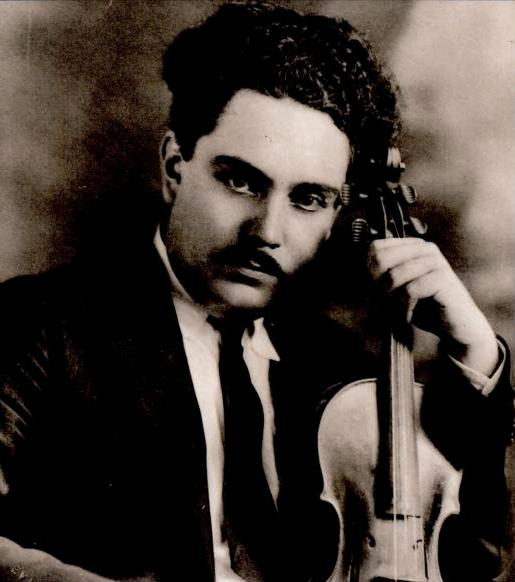
Silvestre Revueltas in 1930

String Quartet No. 2 (Magueyes) is a chamber-music work by the Mexican composer and violinist Silvestre Revueltas from 1931. The score is dedicated to Aurora Murguía and a performance of it lasts between ten and eleven minutes.

== History ==
The quartet is the second of four composed in rapid succession in the initial stage of Revueltas's serious turn to composition. It was written in 1931, and is dedicated to Aurora Murguía, a woman with whom Revueltas had a relationship from 1926 to 1930. Revueltas also dedicated the contemporaneous score of the first version of Cuauhnáhuac to her.

The score was not published during the composer's lifetime, first appearing only in 1953 in an edition by Peer–Southern Music. The printed score differs so greatly from the composer's autograph manuscript that it can only be supposed that it was prepared from a different manuscript version, not presently known to exist.

== Analysis ==
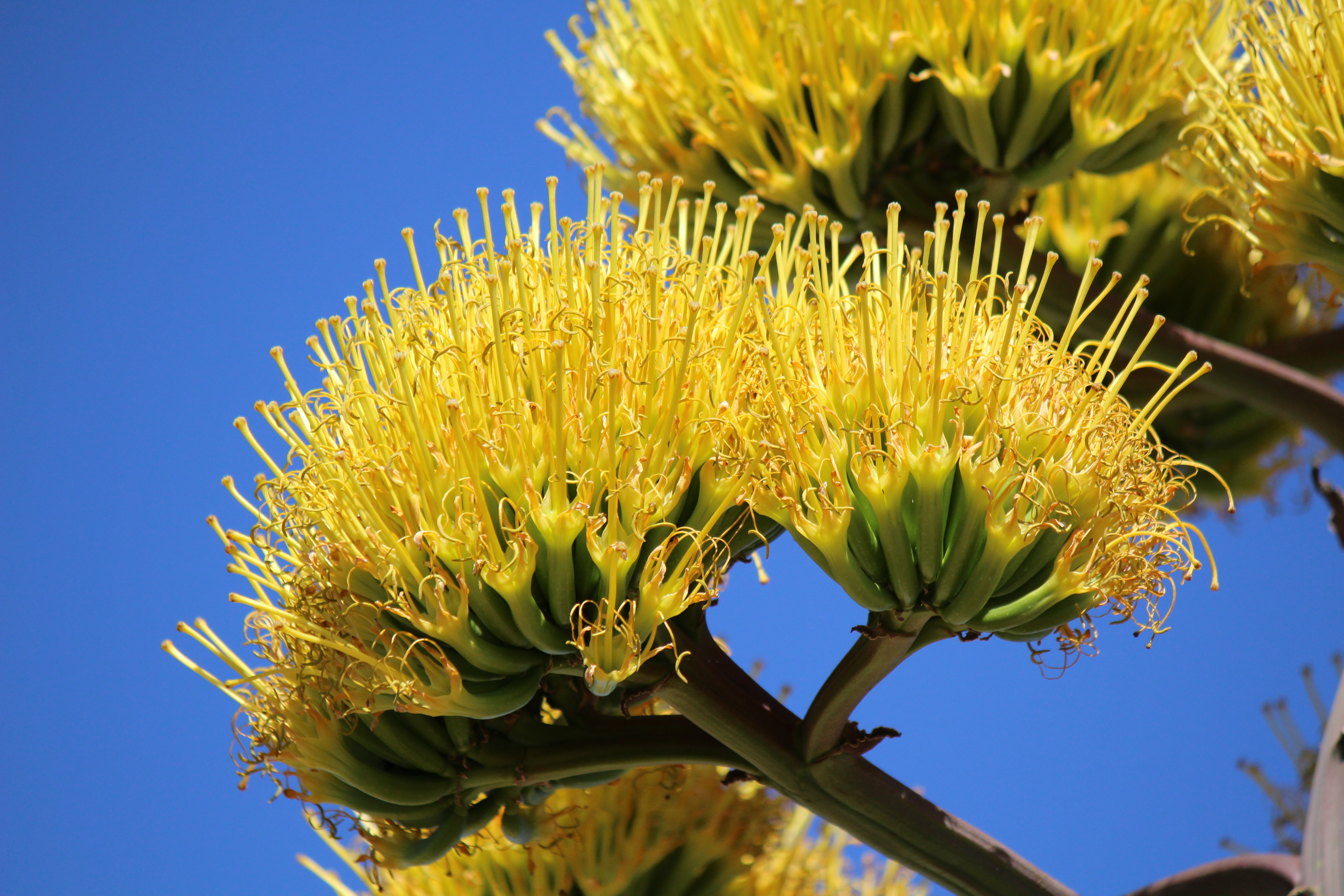
Agave (maguey) blossoms

The quartet is in three movements:

1. Allegro giocoso
2. Molto vivace
3. Allegro molto sostenuto

The subtitle, Magueyes (the plural form of maguey, also known as the agave, or century plant), is somewhat cryptic. It has been suggested that it may refer to the song of the tlachiquero, a peasant who extracts the juice of the maguey to make the alcoholic drink pulque. Two other suggestions are that the cactus may be a metaphor for a political critique of the Mexican ruling bourgeoisie's strong preference for imported European music over the domestic product, or else a symbol of the expression of a composer's independent and prickly self-confident will to survive a confrontation with the highly demanding genre of the string quartet, along with an urge for nationalist music.

However, an even simpler solution (with possible autobiographic allusions) may lie in the fact that, at the very opening of the quartet, Revueltas quotes a famous song of the time, known as "Los Magueyes". One version of the lyrics begins:

Le pido al cielo que se sequen los magueyes
Porque esos magueyes son causa de mi desgracias;
Soy muy borracho y nada me causa gracia,
Porque no me ama la mujer que tanto amé.

I pray to heaven to dry up the magueys,
Because these agaves are the cause of my misfortune;
I am very drunk and nothing gives me satisfaction,
Because the woman I loved so much does not love me.

The first movement is in four sections displaying an A–B–A′–B′ binary-form pattern, which alternatively can be described as a sonata form without a development.

The second movement is divided into three sections, in a fast-slow-fast relationship. The central, slow section quotes a lento interpolation found in the first movement. In fact, most of the motivic material in this "angry scherzo" is held in common with the first movement.

The concluding movement is very short, only thirty-seven bars. It opens with a brief subject in quintuple meter, presented in stretto imitations, and continues in a busy and noisy fashion to the end. The characteristic staggered rhythms of the beginning are gradually brought together into unison rhythms over the course of the movement.

== Discography ==
- Cuartetos de cuerda de Silvestre Revueltas. String Quartets 1–4. Cuarteto de Cuerdas Latinoamericano (Jorge Risi and Aron Bitrán, violins; Javier Montiel, viola; Alvaro Bitrán, cello). Recorded in the Sala Carlos Chávez, Centro Cultural Universitario, June 1984. LP recording, 1 disc: analog, 33⅓ rpm, stereo, 12 in. Voz Viva de México: Serie Música Nueva. México: Universidad Nacional Autónoma de México, 1984. Reissued as Silvestre Revueltas: Los cuartetos de cuerdas, second edition. LP recording, 1 disc: analog, 33⅓ rpm, stereo, 12 in. Voz Viva 337–338. Serie Música nueva MN-22. [Mexico City]: Voz Viva, 1987.
- Silvestre Revueltas, Alberto Ginastera, Heitor Villa-Lobos: String Quartets/Cuartetos para cuerdas. Revueltas: Música de feria and Quartet no. 2 (Magueyes); Ginastera, Quartet no. 1, Op. 20; Villa-Lobos: Quartet no. 17. Cuarteto Latinoamericano. Recorded October 1988 in Carnegie Music Hall, Carnegie, Pennsylvania. CD recording, 1 disc: digital, stereo, 4¾ in. Elan CD 2218. Adelphi, Maryland.: Elan, 1989.
- Silvestre Revueltas. Música de feria: The String Quartets/los cuartetos de cuerda. Quartet No. 1; Quartet No. 2, Magueyes; Quartet No. 3; Quartet No. 4: Música de feria. Cuarteto Latinoamericano. Recorded April 9–10, 1993, at the Carnegie Free Library, Carnegie, Pennsylvania. New Albion NA062CD. Classical Music Library. San Francisco: New Albion Records, 1993. Reissued as Revueltas String Quartets Nos. 1–4. Hong Kong : Naxos Digital Services Ltd., [2009], streaming audio (online resource).
- Martínez Bourguet String Quartet Plays Silvestre Revueltas. String Quartets 1–3 and Música de feria. Martínez Bourguet String Quartet (Pablo Arturo Martínez Bourguet and Ekaterine Martínez Bourguet, violins; Alessia Martínez Bourguet, viola; César Martínez Bourguet, cello). Recorded in the summer of 2006 in the Sala Carlos Chávez, Universidad Nacional Autónoma de México. CD recording, 1 disc: digital, 4¾ in., stereo. MB Producciones [s.n.]. [Mexico]: MB Producciones, 2007.
