= Redes (soundtrack) =

1936 film score by Silvestre Revueltas

Redes is a film score by Silvestre Revueltas for the 1936 eponymous film directed by Fred Zinnemann and Emilio Gómez Muriel. Redes means "nets" in Spanish. It was the composer's first film score, begun in 1934, when he visited the film crew on location in Alvarado, Veracruz. The film concerns the efforts of exploited fishermen to unite. In the US it was issued as The Wave.

== Concert versions ==
The music is scored for symphony orchestra and was recorded by the Symphony Orchestra of Mexico (which was in existence 1928 – 1949). Revueltas arranged a concert version which he premiered in 1936, the same year as the film was released. However, in concert performance the music is usually heard in an arrangement by Erich Kleiber, made in the 1940s after the composer's death. Kleiber's version is in two parts and lasts about 16 minutes.

- Part I
  - The Fisherman
  - The Child’s Funeral
  - Setting Out to Fish
- Part II
  - The Fight
  - The Return of the Fishermen with Their Dead Friend

== Critical reception ==
In his New York Times review, Aaron Copland commented that the music of Revueltas is "above all vibrant and colorful". He regarded this score to possess "many of the qualities characteristic of Revueltas's art". He added:

The need for musical accompaniments by serious composers is gradually becoming evident even to Hollywood. The Mexican Government, choosing Revueltas to supply the music for [Redes], is very much like the USSR asking Shostakovich to supply sound for its best pictures.

== Recordings ==
The complete score has been recorded by the PostClassical Ensemble conducted by Angel Gil-Ordoñez for a version of the film released on DVD by Naxos in 2016. A CD of music from the score by the same performers without narration or dialogue (duration 34.17 minutes, twice the length of the usual concert versions) was issued in 2022, paired with Copland's The City (1939).
