= Colorines =

Symphonic poem by Silvestre Revueltas

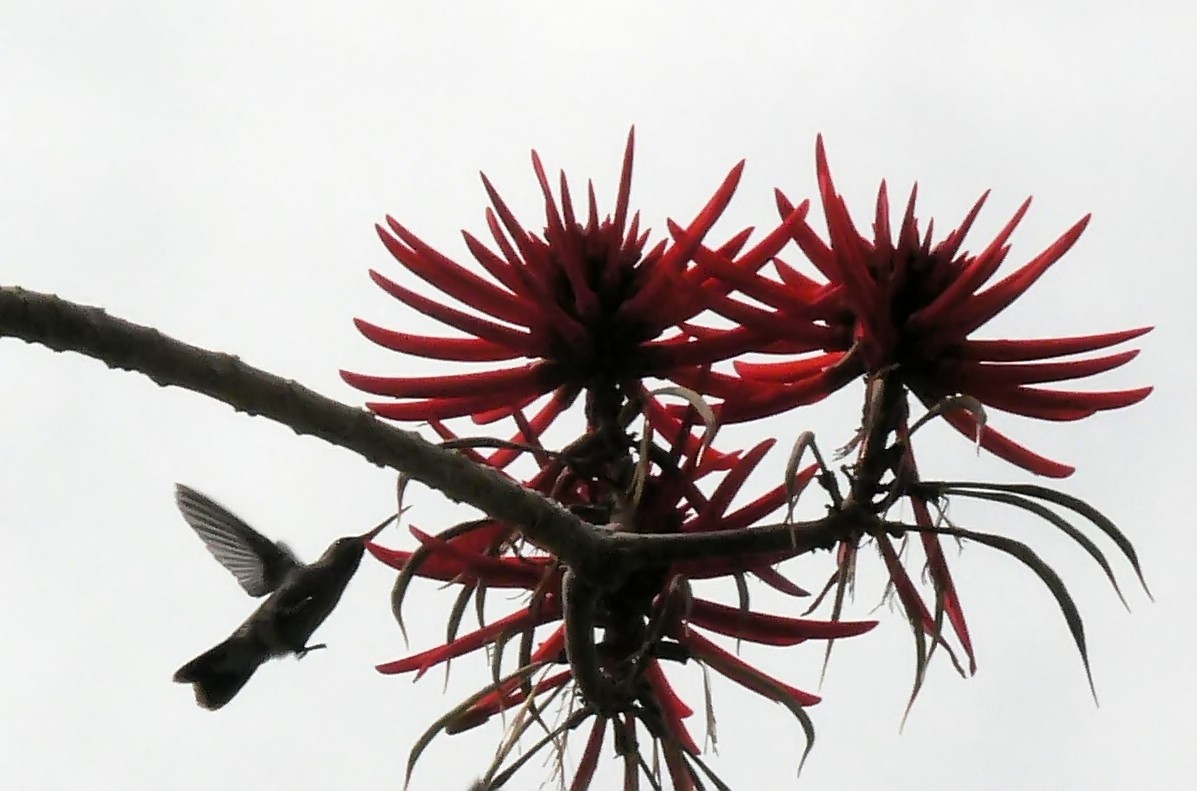
Colorín blossoms with hummingbird

Colorines is a symphonic poem for chamber orchestra by the Mexican composer Silvestre Revueltas, written in 1932.

== History ==
The score of Colorines was completed in May 1932. Although Otto Mayer-Serra says it was composed in 1933, this cannot be correct, because it was performed on 4 November 1932 at the New School for Social Research, PAAC Chamber Orchestra, Nicolas Slonimsky, conducting. Deane Root, however, gives the year of composition as 1930 (apparently quoting from the programme for that 1932 performance), and also cites a programme given on 30 April 1933 in Havana (Conciertos de la Filarmónica, La Habana, Dos Conciertos de Musica Nueva, Teatro Nacional.) also conducted by Slonimsky, that included Colorines.

== Programmatic content ==
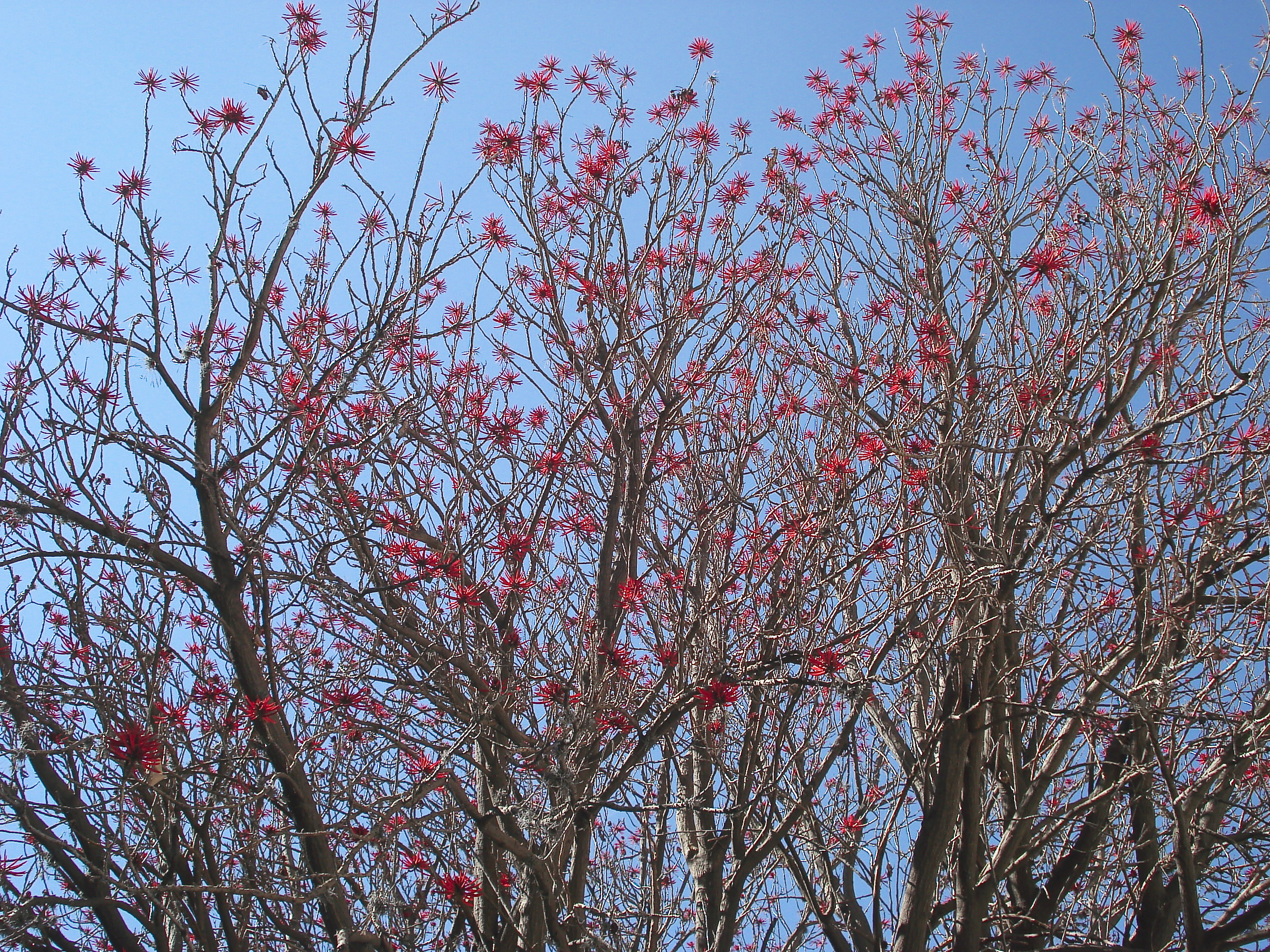
Colorín

Colorín (plural colorines) is the name of a type of tree, Erythrina americana, or Coral Tree, also called Tzompāmitl. The word colorín means color chillón—a “gaudy” or “loud” color. The score of Colorines "not only evokes the deep color that the trees of this name give to the landscape, but also the feelings of the Indian women wearing necklaces made of the red and black fruit of this tree, or of children playing with them".

== Instrumentation ==
The work is scored for a chamber orchestra of piccolo, oboe, E♭ clarinet, B♭ clarinet, one or two bassoons, horn, trumpet, trombone, xylophone, drum, cymbal, bass drum, sonajas (maracas), violins I, violins II, and contrabasses.

== Analysis ==
Colorines, like most of Revueltas's single-movement works, is constructed in a ternary ABA form, with a fast-slow-fast tempo structure. The arrangement of tempos is a natural consequence of the lyrical development of melodic thematic materials as they progressively unfold the narrative of the work.

== Reception ==
By the early 1930s it was clear that Mexican audiences preferred compositions in which nationalism was represented not by the pre-Columbian element of Mexican culture, but rather by mestizo, popular music. By this time, Revueltas had developed a style in which, in a collage-like texture, disparate musical elements from Mexico’s cultural soundscape (the popular, the modern, the urban, the peasant, the Indian, the military, the street life, the market, or the dance) were often juxtaposed so that they often collided. Revueltas did not mean these materials to coexist peacefully. Although the music sometimes celebrates the plurality and vitality of Mexican society, there is audible violence of conflict of cultures, and between premodern and modern social structures. This style was sometimes manifested in a harsh, abstract, and modernist style, and these works, such as Esquinas and Ventanas (both of 1931) were not well received by audiences, but the more lyrical and tonal examples such as Colorines were warmly praised.

== Discography ==
- Simfonicheskie miniatiury. Leningrad Philharmonic Soloists' Ensemble; Gennadi Rozhdestvensky, conductor. Joachín Turina, La oracion del torero; A. Panufnik, A Dedication to Chopin: Five Pieces for Flute and String Orchestra; Baldassare Galuppi, Overture to the opera The Chinese Hero; Silvestre Revueltas, Colorines; Gennadi Rozhdestvensky, A Toast. LP recording, 12 in. (stereo). Melodiya C10-11449-50; U.S.S.R.: Melodiya, 1978.
- Silvestre Revueltas. La coronela (original José Ives Limantour/Eduardo Hernández Moncada version); Itinerarios; Colorines. Santa Barbara Symphony. (1); English Chamber Orchestra; Gisèle Ben-Dor, cond. Recorded Jan. 12, 1998, Oxnard Performing Arts Center, Calif. (1st and 2nd works) and Dec. 19, 1997, Lyndhurst Studios, London (3rd work). CD recording. Koch International Classics 3-7421-2H1. Port Washington, NY : Koch International Classics, 1998. Reissued, Naxos 8.572250; [Hong Kong]: Naxos, 2010.
- Troka. Silvestre Revueltas, Colorines; Música para charlar; Caminos; Troka; Batik; Redes. Moravská Filharmonie; Jorge Pérez-Gómez, cond. CD recording (stereo). Quindecim QP063; México: Quindecim, 2000.
