= Silvestre Revueltas =

Mexican composer (1899–1940)

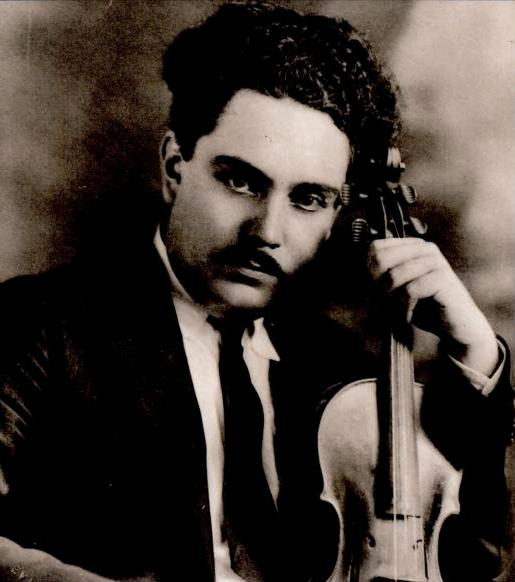
- Revueltas in 1930

Background information
- Born: Silvestre Revueltas Sánchez; December 31, 1899; Santiago Papasquiaro, Durango, Mexico
- Died: October 4, 1940 (aged 40) Mexico City, Mexico
- Occupations: Composer; violinist; conductor
- Education: National Conservatory of Mexico City; St. Edward's University of Austin; Chicago College of Music
- Spouse: Jules Klarecy (m. 1922; sep. 1926) Ángela Acevedo (m. 1930)
- Relatives: Fermín Revueltas Sánchez (brother); José Revueltas (brother); Rosaura Revueltas (sister)

Silvestre Revueltas Sánchez (December 31, 1899 – October 5, 1940) was a Mexican classical music composer, a violinist, and conductor.

== Life ==
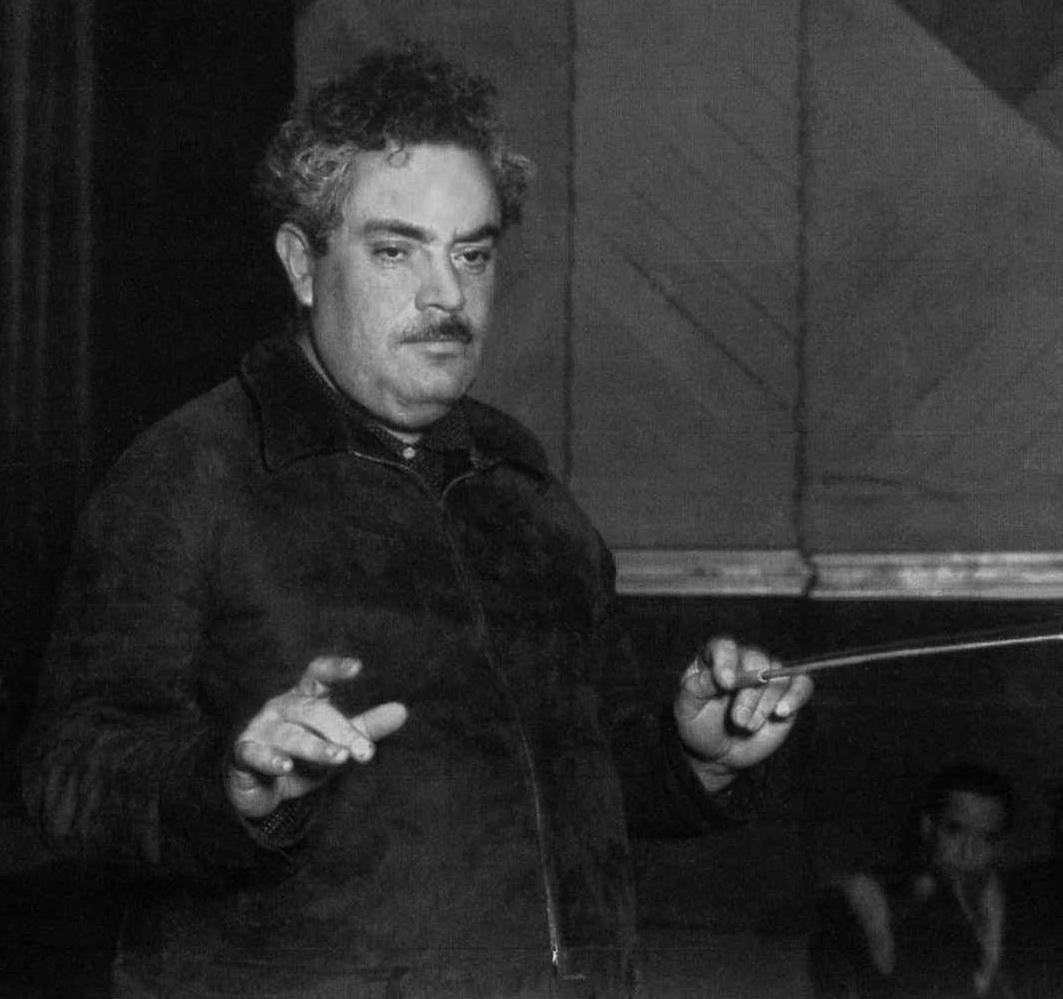
Silvestre Revueltas

Revueltas was born in Santiago Papasquiaro in Durango, and studied at the National Conservatory in Mexico City, St. Edward's University in Austin, Texas, and the Chicago College of Music. He gave violin recitals and in 1929 was invited by Carlos Chávez to become assistant conductor of the National Symphony Orchestra of Mexico, a post he held until 1935. He and Chávez did much to promote contemporary Mexican music. It was around this time that Revueltas began to compose in earnest. He began his first film score, Redes, in 1934, a commission which resulted in Revueltas and Chávez falling out. Chávez had originally expected to write the score, but political changes led to him losing his job in the Ministry of Education, which was behind the film project. Revueltas left Chávez's orchestra in 1935 to be the principal conductor of a newly created and short-lived rival orchestra, the Orquesta Sinfónica Nacional.

Silvestre Revueltas

He was a member of the Revueltas Sánchez family, a number of whom were also famous and recognized in Mexico: his brother Fermín (1901–1935) and sister Consuelo (born before 1908, died before 1999) were painters, sister Rosaura (ca. 1909–1996) was an actress and dancer, and younger brother José Revueltas (1914–1976) was a noted writer. His nephew Román Revueltas Retes, son of José, is a violinist and conductor.

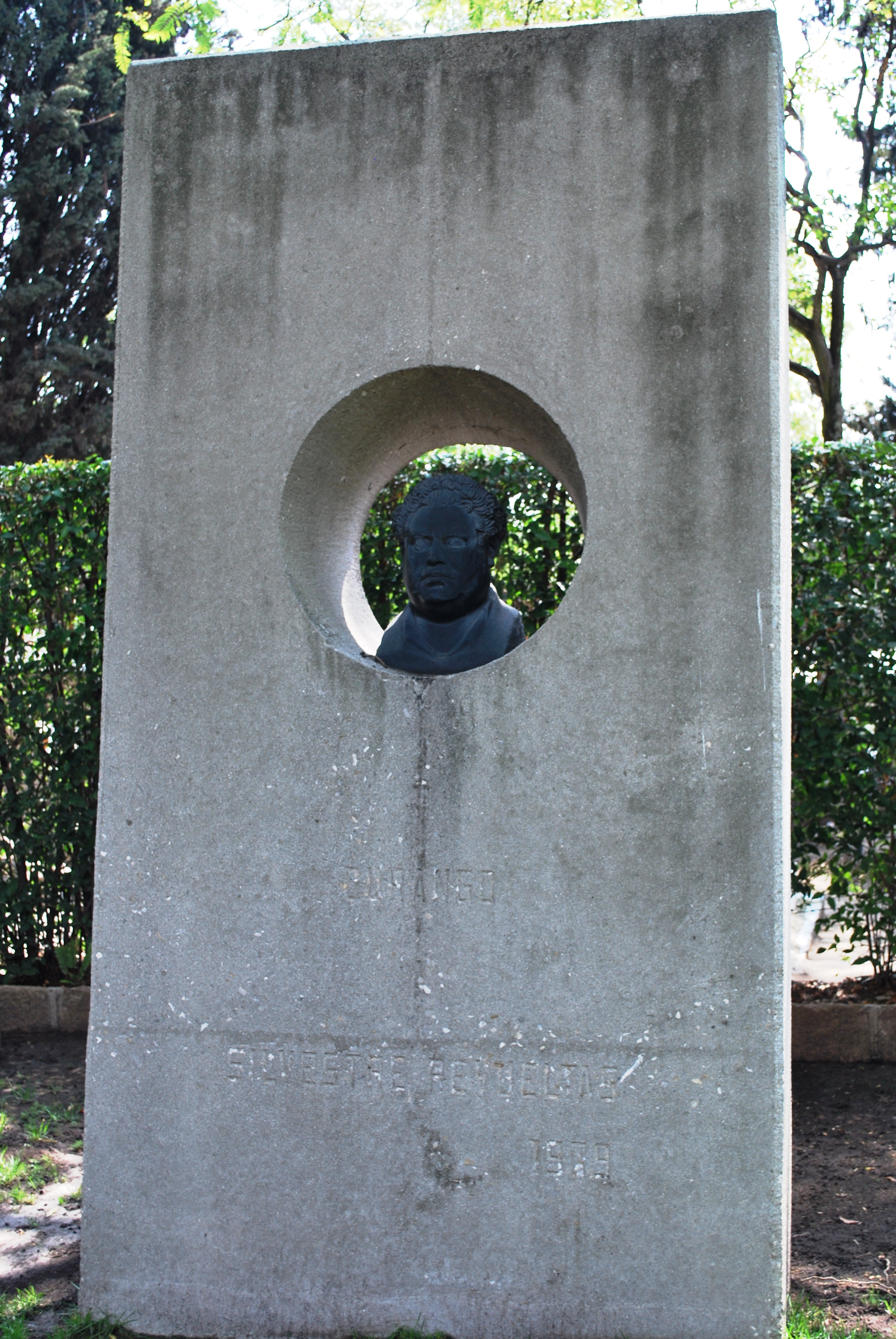
Tomb of Silvestre Revueltas in the Panteon Civil de Dolores cemetery in Mexico City

In 1937 Revueltas went to Spain during the Spanish Civil War, as part of a tour organized by the leftist organization Liga de Escritores y Artistas Revolucionarios (LEAR); upon Francisco Franco's victory, he returned to Mexico. He earned little, and fell into poverty and alcoholism. He died in Mexico City of pneumonia (complicated by alcoholism), at the age of 40 on October 5, 1940, the day his ballet El renacuajo paseador, written four years earlier, was premiered. In 1976, his remains were transferred to the Rotonda de los Hombres Ilustres in Mexico City.

== Works ==
Revueltas wrote film music, chamber music, songs, and a number of other works. His best-known work is the 1960 arrangement by José Yves Limantour drawn from Revueltas' film score for the 1939 film La noche de los mayas, although some dissenting opinions hold that the orchestral work Sensemayá is better known. In any case, it is Sensemayá that is considered Revueltas's masterpiece.

He appeared briefly as a bar piano player in the movie ¡Vámonos con Pancho Villa! (Let's Go with Pancho Villa, Mexico, 1935), for which he composed the music. When shooting breaks out in the bar while he is playing "La Cucaracha", he holds up a sign reading "Se suplica no tirarle al pianista" ("We beg you not to shoot at the pianist").

== Music ==
=== Chamber works ===
- El afilador, 1924
- Batik, 1926
- Four Little Pieces for two violins and cello, 1929
- String Quartet No. 1, 1930
- String Quartet No. 2, 1931
- String Quartet No. 3, 1931
- String Quartet No. 4, Música de feria, 1932
- Tres piezas, for violin and piano, 1932
- Tres pequeñas piezas serias, for quintet of mixed winds, 1932–33
- Ocho x radio, 1933
- Planos, 1934
- Homenaje a Federico García Lorca, 1936
- Éste era un rey 1940
- First Little Serious Piece, for chamber ensemble, 1940
- Second Little Serious Piece, for chamber ensemble, 1940

=== Orchestral works ===
- Pieza para orquesta, 1929
- Cuauhnáhuac, for string orchestra, 1931; revised for full orchestra, 1931; revised again for full orchestra 1932
- Esquinas, 1931 (rev. 1933)
- Ventanas, 1931
- Alcancías, 1932
- Colorines, for chamber orchestra, 1932
- Janitzio, 1933 (rev. 1936)
- Toccata (sin fuga), for violin and chamber orchestra 1933
- Troka, 1933
- Caminos, 1934
- Danza geométrica (orchestral version of Planos), 1934
- Sensemayá, 1938
- Itinerarios, 1938
- Música para charlar, 1938 (from the film score of Ferrocarriles de Baja California)

=== Ballets ===
- El renacuajo paseador, 1936
- La coronela, 1939 (unfinished; orch. by Moncayo, arr. by Limantour; also completed by Blas Galindo and Candelario Huízar, lost)

=== Film scores ===
- Redes, 1935
- ¡Vámonos con Pancho Villa!, 1936
- El indio, 1938
- Ferrocarriles de Baja California, 1938
  - selections reworked as Música para charlar
- Bajo el signo de la muerte, 1939
- La noche de los mayas (Night of the Mayas), 1939
- ¡Que viene mi marido!, 1940

=== Songs ===
- Duo para pato y canario, voice and chamber orchestra, 1931
- "Ranas" (Frogs) and "El tecolote" (The Owl), voice and piano, 1931
- Caminando, 1937
- "Canto a una muchacha negra" (words: Langston Hughes), voice and piano 1938
- Cinco canciones para niños y dos canciones profanas, 1938–1939

=== Piano ===
- Adagio
- Tragedia en forma de rábano (no es plagio)
- Allegro
- Canción (a passage used also in Cuauhnáhuac)

== See also ==
- Daniel Ayala Pérez – studied violin with Revueltas
