= Sensemayá =

1937 tone poem by Silvestre Revueltas

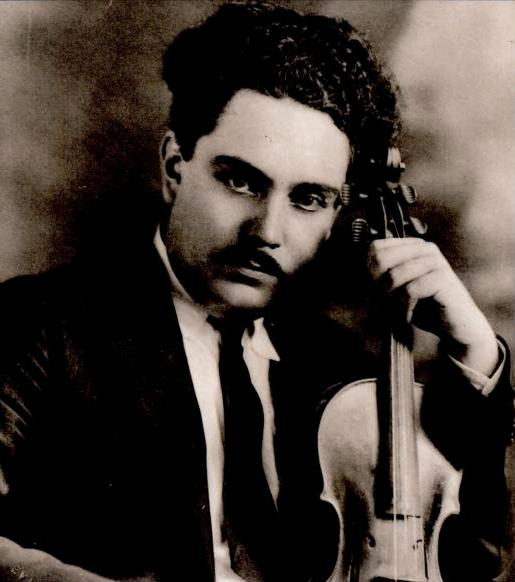
Silvestre Revueltas in 1930

Sensemayá is a composition for orchestra by the Mexican composer Silvestre Revueltas, which is based on the poem of the same title by the Cuban poet Nicolás Guillén. It is one of Revueltas's most famous compositions.

== Poem ==
Guillén's poem evokes a ritual Afro-Caribbean chant performed while killing a snake:

Canto para matar una culebra :¡Mayombe-bombe-mayombé! :¡Mayombe-bombe-mayombé! :¡Mayombe-bombe-mayombé! :La culebra tiene los ojos de vidrio :la culebra viene y se enreda en un palo :Con sus ojos de vidrio, en un palo :Con sus ojos de vidrio :La culebra camina sin patas :La culebra se esconde en la yerba :Caminando se esconde en la yerba :Caminando sin patas :¡Mayombe-bombe-mayombe! :¡Mayombe-bombe-mayombé! :¡Mayombe-bombe-mayombé!

The poem "Sensemayá" is based on Afro-Cuban religious cults, preserved in the cabildos, self-organized social clubs for the African slaves. African religions were transmitted from generation to generation. In this poem we meet an adept known as the mayombero. He is knowledgeable in the area of herbal medicine, as well as being the leader of rituals. In Sensemayá, the mayombero leads a ritual which offers the sacrifice of a snake to a god. One of the main motives in Sensemayá is based on this word mayombero. This chant "mayombe, bombe mayombé", is an example of Guillén's use of repetition, derived from an actual ceremony.

== Orchestral composition ==
Revueltas first composed Sensemayá in Mexico City in 1937, in a version for small orchestra. In 1938, he expanded it into a full-scale orchestral work for 27 wind instruments (woodwinds and brass), 14 percussion instruments, and strings. As one advertising blurb for the score describes it:

The work begins with a slow trill in the bass clarinet as the percussion plays the sinuous, syncopated rhythm that drives the work. Soon a solo bassoon enters playing an eerie but rhythmic ostinato bassline. The tuba then enters playing the first of this work's two major themes, a muscular, ominous motif. Other brass join in to play the theme, growing louder and more emphatic, but rigorously yoked to the underlying rhythm. Eventually the horns blast as loudly as they can, with obsessive trills on the low clarinets far underneath, and the strings enter with the slashing second theme. The brass take up this new theme and bring it to a climax, after which the music returns to its opening texture. This recapitulation brings with it a mood of foreboding. The rhythm becomes even more obsessive, and finally the music reaches a massive climax during which both themes are played, overlapping, sometimes in part and sometimes in whole, by the entire orchestra in what sounds like a musical riot. The coda feels like the final dropping of a knife.

=== Instrumentation ===
The score of the second version of Revueltas's composition calls for a large orchestra consisting of:

Woodwinds

4 flutes (2nd doubling piccolos)
2 oboes
1 English horn
1 piccolo clarinet in E♭
2 soprano clarinets in B♭
1 bass clarinet
3 bassoons
1 contrabassoon

Brass

4 horns in F
4 trumpets in C
3 trombones
1 tuba

Percussion

timpani

xylophone
claves
maracas
raspador
gourd
small Indian drum
bass drum
2 tom-toms (high and low)
cymbals
2 gongs (large and small)
glockenspiel

Keyboards

piano
celesta

Strings

violins (1st and 2nd)
violas
violoncellos
basses

== Sources ==
- Dean, Jack Lee. 1992. "Silvestre Revueltas: A Discussion of the Background and Influences Affecting His Compositional Style". Ph.D. thesis. Austin: University of Texas at Austin.
