= Alcancías =

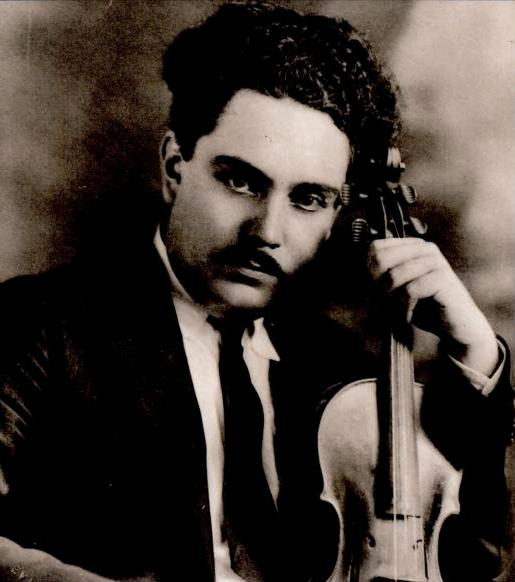
Silvestre Revueltas in 1930

Alcancías (Penny Banks) is a composition for small orchestra by the Mexican composer Silvestre Revueltas, written in 1932. It is in three movements with a total duration in performance of about eight minutes.

== History ==
Alcancías takes as its subject a very typical product of Mexican popular art, those multicolored pottery penny-banks, usually small and in the form of a pig or fish, which generally must be broken in order to remove the money inside. The work was composed in the first half of 1932, and was completed in July.

== Instrumentation ==
Alcancías is scored for a chamber orchestra of piccolo, oboe, E♭ clarinet, B♭ clarinet, horn, 2 trumpets in C, trombone, timpani, percussion (xylophone, maracas, snare drum, suspended cymbals, güiro, bass drum) and strings. Despite the absence of the instrument in the score, cites Alcancías as one of several Revueltas compositions in which the tuba is prominent

== Analysis ==
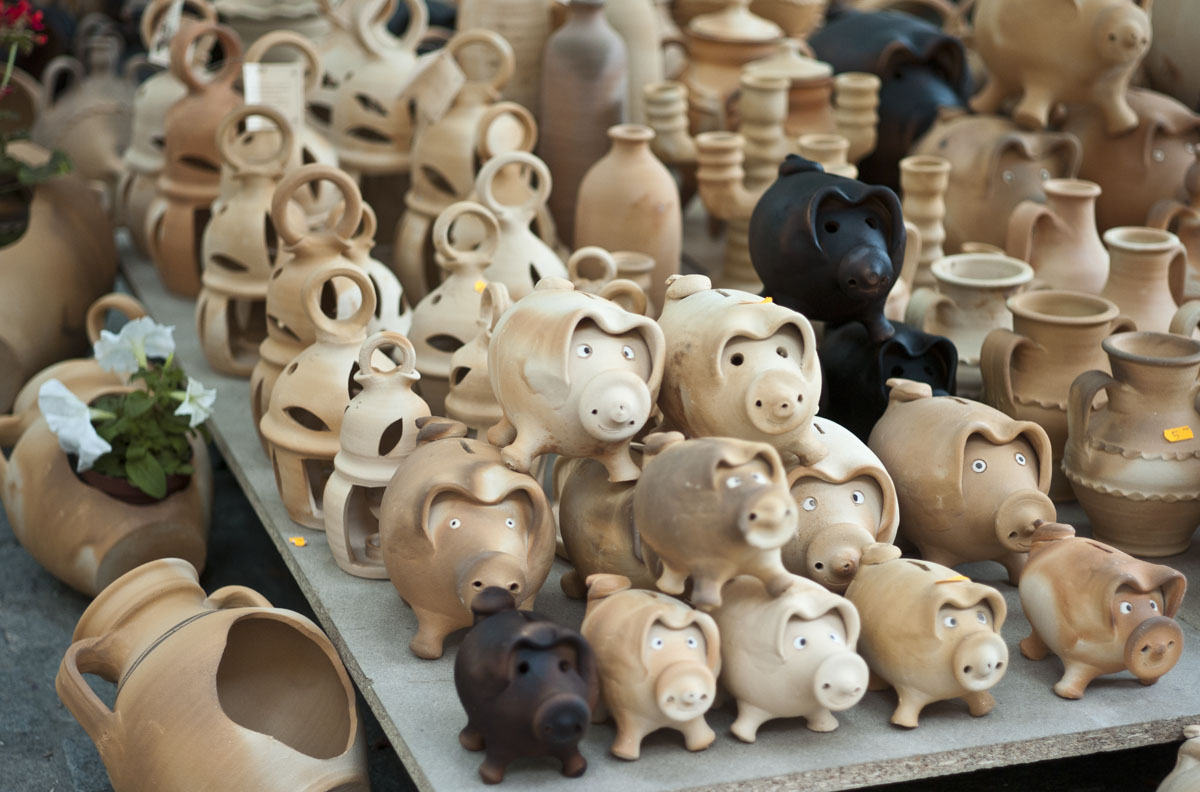
Alcancías, in the form of piggy banks, Feria de alfarería de Zamora 2012

Alcancías consists of three movements:

1. Allegro
2. Andante
3. Allegro vivo

The first movement has a complex and unorthodox three-part architectural structure; the second, lyrical movement is in essence a folk song; and the last movement has the character of a lively traditional huapango.

An off-balance five-bar introduction featuring melodic fragments with strong accents on the off-beats leads to the opening theme of the first main section, a folk-like melody in parallel thirds. The movement can be described as modernist, angular, motoric, and tonally ambiguous. It is in a three-part, ABC form, in which each section consists of three smaller units. "It serves as an excellent example of Revueltas’s predilection for triple subdivisions and the creative way in which he applied and combined them to create extended, more elaborate forms".

The second movement is in a contrasting lyrical, tonal, and folk-like style, suggesting a melancholy canción ranchera. An eight-bar introduction is followed by a first verse (b. 9–31), an eight-bar interlude, a second verse (b. 40–59), and a concluding eight-bar coda. The scoring here features unison violins together with piccolo and oboe in thirds, and the E-flat clarinet entering after an oboe solo and a trio of horn, trumpet, and trombone. The strings and winds in the high register above a rumbling accompaniment creates a moment of tension that "extends beyond everything and suggests a disruption of the underworld".

In the third movement, Revueltas's chief goal is to place elements of Mexican popular music in the foreground. Formal aspects take a secondary place to the natural developmental unfolding of folk thematic material in the improvisatory manner characteristic of the huapango.

== Recordings ==
- Silvestre Revueltas: Música de camara. Alcancías; El renacuajo paseador; Ocho por radio; Toccata sin fuga; Planos. London Sinfonietta; David Atherton, conductor. Recorded November 1979, in London. LP recording, 1 sound disc: analogue, 33 1/3 rpm, stereo. RCA Victor MRS-019; Mexico: RCA Victor, 1980. This recording of Alcancías reissued as parts of:
  - Night of the Mayas: Music of Silvestre Revueltas. CD recording, 1 sound disc: analogue/digital, 4 3/4 in (120 mm), stereo. Catalyst 09026-62672-2. [New York]: Catalyst, 1994.
  - Silvestre Revueltas, Centennial Anthology (1899–1999): 15 Masterpieces. CD recording, 2 sound discs: digital, 4 3/4 in (120 mm), monaural/stereo. RCA Red Seal 09026-63548-2. New York: RCA Red Seal, 1999.
