= Cuauhnáhuac =

Orchestral composition by Mexican composer Silvestre Revueltas

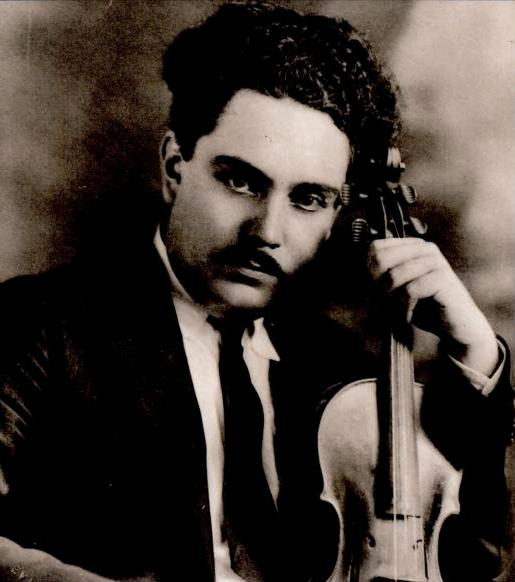
Silvestre Revueltas in 1930

Cuauhnáhuac is an orchestral composition by the Mexican composer Silvestre Revueltas. It exists in three versions, the first for string orchestra, the other two for full orchestra with winds and percussion. The first version takes nearly 15 minutes to perform, while the third lasts only about 11 minutes.

== History ==
In March 1925, Revueltas left Chicago and his wife of five years, Jule Klarasy, who stayed behind with their then three-year-old daughter Carmen. They were divorced in June 1927, by which time Revueltas had accepted a teaching post at the College of Music in San Antonio, Texas. There he met Aurora Murguía, the widow of Mexican revolutionary General Francisco Murguía, and they soon were living together. Late in 1928, Revueltas received an invitation from Carlos Chávez offering him a position teaching violin and conducting the student Orchestra in the National Conservatory in Mexico City, as well as the post of Associate Conductor of Chávez's recently founded Orquesta Sinfónica Mexicana. Revueltas seized the opportunity and early in 1929 he and Aurora moved to Mexico City. It was at this time that Revueltas began composing in earnest, and the manuscript of one of his earliest large-scale compositions, the string-orchestra version of Cuauhnáhuac, is dedicated to Aurora. He would also dedicate his Second String Quartet (Magueyes) (1931) to her.

As in many other of his compositions, Revueltas composed several versions of Cuauhnáhuac. The first, for string orchestra, was written in June 1931 during a stay in Cuernavaca, the city from which it derives its name. He then immediately set about rescoring it for full orchestra, in an unpublished version completed later in the same year. In the following year he created the third and final version, completing the new score in December 1932. This last version was premiered on 2 June 1933 by the Orquesta Sinfónica de México, conducted by the composer.

== Instrumentation ==
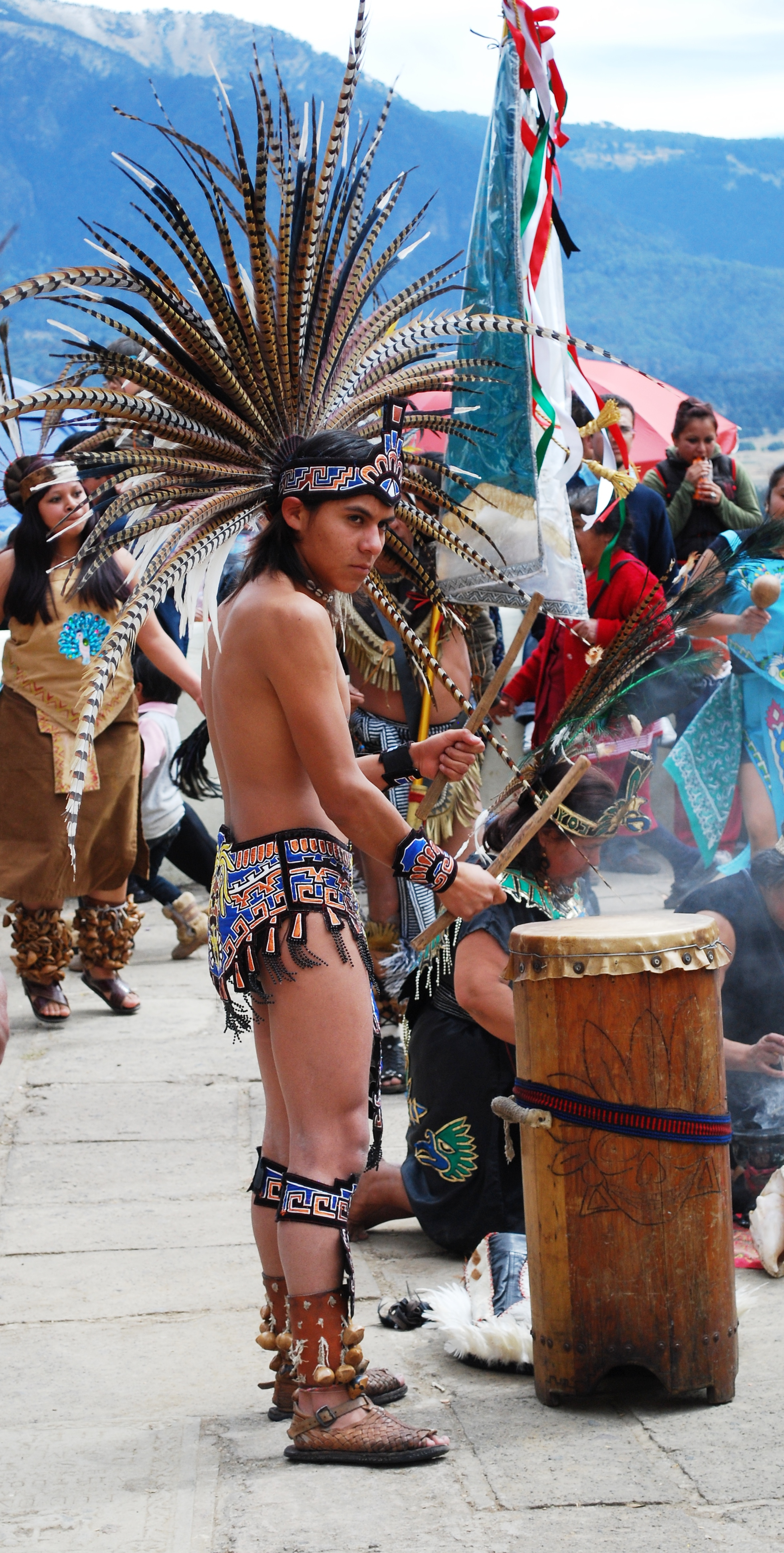
Huehuetl (Indian drum)

The first version of Cuauhnáhuac was for string orchestra. The second version is unpublished and the scoring unknown. The third, published version is scored for a full orchestra of piccolo, 2 flutes, 2 oboes, cor anglais, E♭ clarinet, 2 B♭ clarinets, bass clarinet, 3 bassoons, 4 horns, 4 trumpets, 3 trombones, tuba, percussion (4 players: woodblock, bomba [or bass drum], 2 Indian drums, cymbals, xylophone, 2 tambourines, gong), and strings.

== Programmatic content ==
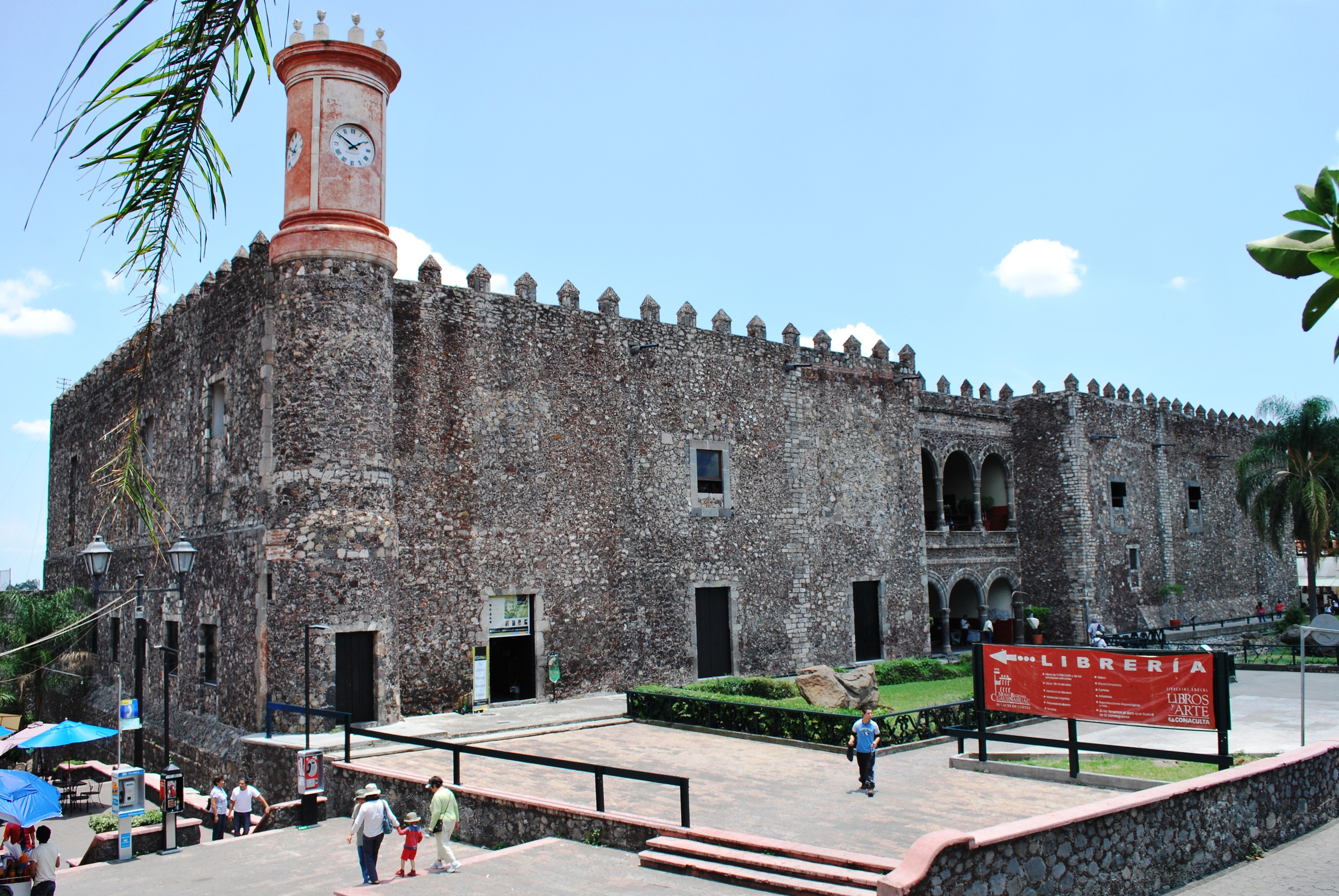
Palace of Cortés in Cuernavaca

"Cuauhnáhuac", a Nahuatl word meaning "near the forest" (from quauitl, "tree" and nauac or nahuac, "near"), was the name given by the Tlalhuicas, a people related ethnically to the Aztecs, to the capital of their province of Tlahuican. The name was deformed into Cuernavaca ("cow horn") by the invading Spanish in the 16th century. The Aztec emperor Moctezuma II is said to have had a country palace there, and when he was deposed by the conquistadores, their commander, Hernán Cortés, built a stone palacio on its main square after he had selected Cuernavaca to be an administrative seat for his massive, semiautonomous estate, the Marquisate of the Valley of Oaxaca. Although the town and its surrounding territories became a thriving mercantile area, home to a diverse population, Cuernavaca's municipal government was always staffed entirely by members of the local indigenous elite, all of whom claimed (rightly or wrongly) to be descendants of the elite class of the pre-conquest altepetl. The place has often been described as a "land of eternal spring" or "paradise" by nineteenth- and twentieth-century travelers.

Revueltas provided a tongue-in-cheek introduction to the score: "This is a music without tourism. In the orchestra, the huehuetl (Indian drum) is used as a means of nationalist propaganda. Other instruments in the score are even more nationalistic, but no attention should be paid to them; it is all just anticapitalist agitation".

== Analysis ==
Cuauhnáhuac employs a chromatic and dissonant idiom suggesting the primitivist folk-like style of early Stravinsky. This is achieved through the use of percussive, polyrhythmic relationships, ostinatos, and irregular metric successions. The opening section blends the influence of Claude Debussy with that of Stravinsky. Like many of Revueltas's single-movement works, it is cast in a tripartite form, in which the atonal opening character returns in the chromatic concluding part. In between comes a contrasting pentatonic middle section. Although it bears the markings of inspiration of Romanticism, its essentially dissonant character, produced by the superposition of different harmonic levels and a strong percussive background, show the emergence of a personal style of composition. An rudimentary example of superposed harmonic levels occurs at rehearsal 45, where the winds and xylophone play a memorable gentle melody in E♭ major, accompanied by the cellos in G major.

The work is simple in overall form, but complex in the organization of its component sections. It is tripartite in structure, though the overriding aesthetic is one of continual change. Although the final section returns to the texture of the first and recapitulates some of its material, this is only used as a background for the introduction of seven new motives, another mestizo melody, and two more ostinatos. Given the amount of new material introduced, it would be more accurate to describe it as an ABC form than an ABA. The simultaneous presentation of different motivic material produces a pervasive, dissonant polytonality. Some of the motives are diatonic, some are pentatonic, others use the whole-tone scale, while the opening section uses all twelve tones of the chromatic scale.

The middle section (b. 165–214) creates a strong contrast with what went before (and will come after) by turning to a tranquil mood and exclusively A-minor pentatonic material. This persistence of a single tonality is uncharacteristic for Revueltas's music, and may occur here in order to project more plainly the calmness of the Indian aspect of the work by avoiding complex rhythmic and tonal configurations, in contrast to the mestizo elements of the two outer sections.

== Reception ==
By 1928, it had become clear that Mexican critics, performers, and the public favoured a musical nationalism based on popular rather than imagined pre-Columbian styles. When Chávez's Indianist ballets El fuego nuevo (1921) and Los cuatro soles (1925) were first performed in 1928 and 1930, respectively, they were given a chilly if not hostile reception. Revueltas's Cuauhnáhuac fared better when it was premiered in 1933, due to its less obvious and rather parodic Indianist content.

Cuauhnáhuac is regarded as the work with which Revueltas began his most productive compositional phase, a composition which already displays the qualities that define his personal style. It has been described as "a carefully constructed composition showing an inexhaustible melodic imagination and a masterful use of counterpoint", and praised for "the extraordinary vitality of all the voices, the striking contrasts of instrumental coloring, and the superposition of different harmonic planes". An especially admired trait is its instinctual quality, which enables Revueltas to invest the music "with fresh compositional intent, a primary character or dislocated cubism which, as collage, arises spontaneously in his work".

However, not all reception has been uncritically enthusiastic. When the score was first published, Henry Cowell found that, though it "bristles with unique and exciting sounds and the whole work has the attractiveness of original genius", he predicted its "scattered" form would prevent it from entering the standard repertory, even if it might often be played as "an amusing novelty". He found the mixture of Central American Indian culture with a European modernistic style "rather awkward", and the ending "so incongruous as to turn the whole thing into a joke, amusing enough, but leaving, if not a rather bad taste in the ear, at least an unpleasant sound in the mouth".

== Discography ==
=== String-orchestra version ===
- Sensemayá: The Unknown Revueltas. Troka; Cuauhnáhuac (string orchestra version); Five Songs for voice and instrumental ensemble. Escenas infantiles; Cuatro pequeños trozos; El afilador; Parián; Sensemayá (original, chamber version, 1937). Camerata de las Américas, Enrique Arturo Diemecke, conductor; Lourdes Ambriz, soprano; Jesús Suaste, baritone; Cuarteto Latinoamericano; Octeto Vocal Juan D. Tercero. Recorded September 1996 at the Sala Nezahualcóyotl, Mexico City. Music of Latin American Masters. CD recording, 1 sound disc: digital, 4¾ in., stereo. Dorian DOR-90244.Troy, NY: Dorian Recordings, 1996.

=== Full-orchestra version ===
- España. Emmanuel Chabrier: España; Silvestre Revueltas: Cuauhnáhuac, Sensemayá; Mosolov; Iron Foundry. Philharmonic Symphony Orchestra of London, Argeo Quadri, cond. Westminster Laboratory Series. LP recording, 1 sound disc: analog, 33⅓ rpm, monaural; 12 in. Westminster W-LAB 7004. [USA]: Westminster, 1950s. Reissued, with additional material (Dukas: The Sorcerer's Apprentice; Saint-Saëns: Danse macabre; Bacchanale from Samson and Delilah; Chabrier: Marche joyeuse), on Hi-fi Feast for Orchestra. LP recording. Westminster XWN 18451. New York: Westminster, 1960s.
- Sones de mariachi. Orquesta Filarmónica de la Ciudad de México, Enrique Bátiz, cond. Blas Galindo: Sones de mariachi; Rodolfo Halffter: Obertura festiva; Silvestre Revueltas: Janitzio, Cuauhnáhuac; Bernal Jiminez: Tres cartas de México. LP recording, 1 sound disc: analog, 33⅓ rpm, 12 in., stereo. Departamento del Distrito Federal 270229. Mexico: Departamento del Distrito Federal, 1985.
- Silvestre Revueltas: Música orquestal (Redes, Itinerarios, Caminos, Homenaje a Federico Garcia Lorca, Danza geométrica, Cuauhnáhuac, Janitzio). New Philharmonia Orchestra, Eduardo Mata, cond. Recorded November 1975 in Walthamstrow, London. LP recording, 2 sound discs: analog, 33⅓ rpm, 12 in., stereo. RCA Red Seal MRSA-1. Mexico: RCA Red Seal, 1976. Reissued, with three additional items (Planos, Ocho por Radio, and Sensemayá, UNAM Philharmonic Orchestra, Eduardo Mata, cond., recorded 1969) as Eduardo Mata Edition Vol 10: Revueltas. CD recording, 2 discs. RCA 30986. Partial reissue on Silvestre Revueltas: Centennial Anthology 1899–1999: 15 masterpieces. CD recording, 2 discs: RCA Red Seal 09026-63548-2. New York: RCA Red Seal, 1999.
- Música mexicana. Volume 3. (José Pablo Moncayo: Huapango; Manuel M Ponce: Concierto del sur; Rodolfo Halffter: Violin Concerto, Op. 11. Silvestre Revueltas: Cuauhnáhuac) Henryk Szeryng, violin; Orquesta Filármonica de la ciudad de México, Enrique Bátiz, cond. CD recording, 1 sound disc: digital, 4¾ in., stereo. ASV CD DCA 871. London: ASV, 1994.
