= Homenaje a Federico García Lorca =

1936 composition for chamber orchestra by Silvestre Revueltas

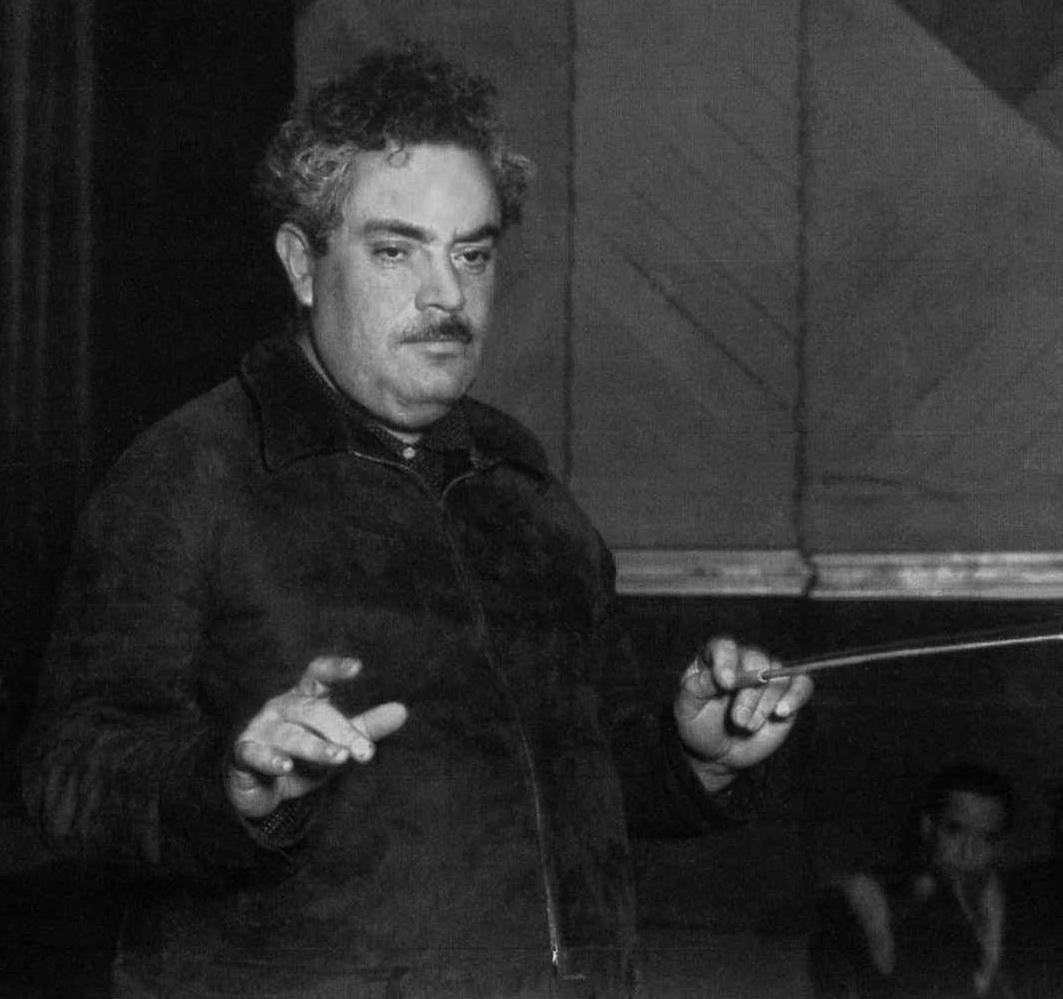
Silvestre Revueltas

Homenaje a Federico García Lorca (Homage to Federico García Lorca) is a work for chamber orchestra by the Mexican composer Silvestre Revueltas.

== History ==
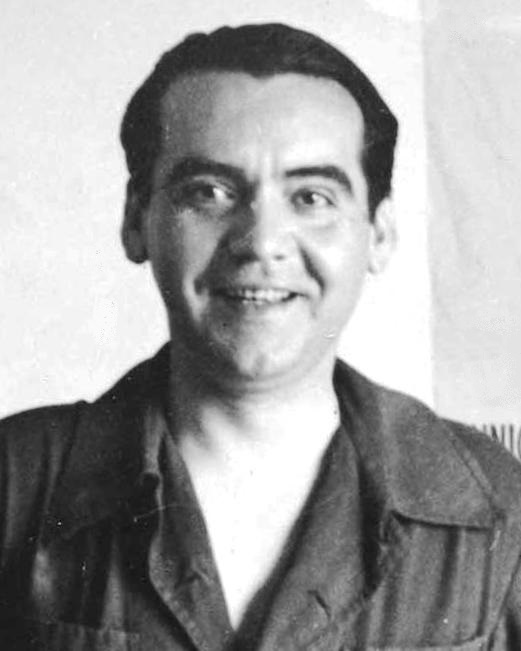
Federico García Lorca in 1932

On 19 August 1936, the Spanish poet Federico García Lorca was murdered by fascist militia forces. Outraged, along with many other intellectuals and artists, in October Revueltas composed Homenaje a Federico García Lorca, one of his most important works, which was premiered on 14 November 1936 conducted by the composer. It was given its first Spanish performance at the Salón de Actos de la Asociación de Amigos de Mexico in Madrid on 17 September 1937.

== Instrumentation ==
The work is scored for a chamber orchestra of piccolo, E♭ clarinet, two trumpets, trombone, tuba, tamtam, xylophone, piano, two violins, and double bass. The absence of low woodwinds, violas, and cellos produces a sound meant to evoke a Mexican village band, or the sound of Indian music.

== Analysis ==
The composition is in three movements:

1. Baile (Dance): Lento (quasi recitativo)–Allegro ( = 200)–Lento (quasi recitativo)
2. Duelo (Affliction): = 96
3. Son: = 104–112

The main, Allegro, section of the first movement is typical of Revueltas's orchestration. An almost constant rhythmic substructure in 4/16 time is produced by the staccato of the piano, repeated plaintive fourths in the violins, and an obstinately repeated G in semiquavers in the contrabasses. Over this texture, wind instruments present the thematic material, "at once sad and gay, in a light contrapuntal passage of the greatest transparency".

The second movement, Duelo, is written in a style close to the Andalusian martinetes sung by miners and prisoners awaiting sentence. In imitation of the characteristic hammer-and-anvil accompaniment, Revueltas wrote a major-second ostinato for xylophone and pizzicato double bass, over which the trumpet plays a mournful melody in C♯ minor.

The final movement superimposes several ostinatos, a device Revueltas uses extensively throughout his oeuvre.
