= Voz viva de México =

Voz viva de México ("Living Voice of Mexico") is a collection of readings by authors from their own works. It has nearly one thousand audio documents by Spanish language writers and essayists, which have been recorded since 1959 and published in various formats. It is produced by the Department of Literature of the Autonomous National University of Mexico (UNAM). Among the authors represented in this collection are several winners of prestigious prizes such as the Nobel, Cervantes, and the Princess of Asturias Awards for Literature. In 2006 this collection was added to the Registro Memoria del Mundo de México (World Memorial Registry of Mexico), recognised by UNESCO.

The project began in 1959 on the initiative of Efrén del Pozo from Radio UNAM. The first texts recorded were of Alfonso Reyes, followed by Jaime Torres Bodet, Carlos Pellicer, Martín Luis Guzmán, es:Artemio de Valle Arizpe, José Gorostiza and Agustín Yáñez. When Max Aub took over the project, he decided to subdivide it under the following headings:

- Mexican Literature (work of dead authors)
- Political Testimonies
- New Music
- Folklore
- Student Series
- Music for the scene.

Later, the Union of Latin American Universities requested UNAM to expand the registry to include authors from the rest of Latin America. In response the collection was subdivided into "Voz viva of Mexico" and "Voz viva of Latin America", the latter including recordings of texts by José Martí, Rubén Darío, Pablo Neruda, and Julio Cortázar.

By 2010, Voz viva de México had published 164 titles on vinyl records and 170 compact discs, many of which were remastered from the vinyl recordings. In 2014 UNAM signed an agreement with the Cervantes Institute permitting that Institute to incorporate the collection into its own archives.
