= List of 20th-century Mexican composers =

This is a list of 20th-century Mexican composers:

- Sergio Berlioz (born 1963)
- Miguel Bernal Jiménez (1910–1956)
- Julián Carrillo (1875–1965)
- Daniel Catán (1949–2011)
- Carlos Chavez (1899–1978)
- Manuel Enríquez (1926–1994)
- Julio Estrada (born 1943)
- Blas Galindo (1910–1993)
- Luis Herrera de la Fuente (1916–2014)
- Rodolfo Halffter (1900–1987)
- Juan Sebastian Lach (born 1970)
- Ana Lara (born 1959)
- Mario Lavista (born 1943)
- Sergio Luque (born 1976)
- Arturo Marquez (born 1950)
- Carlos Jiménez Mabarak (1916–1994)
- Eduardo Mata (1942–1995)
- José Pablo Moncayo (1912–1958)
- Conlon Nancarrow (born 1912)
- Carlos Sandoval (born 1956)
- Gabriela Ortiz (born 1965)
- Hilda Paredes (born 1957)
- Gabriel Pareyon (born 1974)
- Manuel M. Ponce (1882–1948)
- Victor Rasgado (born 1958)
- Silvestre Revueltas (1899–1940)
- Manuel Rocha Iturbide (born 1963)
- Carlos Sanchez-Gutierrez (born 1963)
- Carlos Sandoval (born 1956)
- Javier Torres Maldonado (born 1968)
