= Gabriel Pareyon =

Musical artist (born 1974)

- Gabriel Pareyon, 2003.

Background information
- Born: 1974 (age 51–52)
- Origin: Mexico
- Genres: Contemporary music, Mexican composers, 21st-century music
- Occupations: Composer & musicologist
- Years active: 1995–present

Gabriel Pareyon (born October 23, 1974, Zapopan, Jalisco) is a polymathic Mexican composer and musicologist, who has published literature on topics of philosophy and semiotics.

He has a PhD in musicology from the University of Helsinki, where he studied with Solomon Marcus and Eero Tarasti (2006–2011). He received bachelor's and master's degrees in composition at the Royal Conservatoire, The Hague (2000–2004), where he studied with Clarence Barlow. He previously studied at the Composers’ Workshop of the National Conservatoire of Music, Mexico City (1995–1998), led by Mario Lavista.

== Composer ==
Pareyon's output is specially known by Xochicuicatl cuecuechtli (2011), the first modern opera in the Americas that exclusively uses a Native American language (Nahuatl in this case) as well as music instruments native to Mexico. This work was awarded by the UNESCO and the International Theatre Institute, in 2015. More recently, his Eight Songs in Nahuatl (Chicueyicuicatl), for solo voice and percussion quartet, made themselves known simultaneously on an international live tour (awarded at the Classical:NEXT Festival Schauspiel Hannover, 2022) and a series of viewings in film version (best musical feature in an indigenous language, PARAI Festival, Chennai, India, 2022, and Wairoa Māori Film Festival, New Zealand, 2022).

As young composer (from 2006 and earlier), several works written by Pareyon were selected for the Thailand International Saxophone Competition for Composers (Bangkok, 2006, I Prize), the 2nd International Jurgenson Competition for young composers (Moscow, 2003, II Prize) and the 3rd Andrzej Panufnik International Composition Competition (Kraków, 2001, III Prize). His earlier production includes works for Classical instruments and ensembles. He also experimented with Mexican traditional instruments (such as huehuetl, teponaztli and a wide variety of woodwinds), and metre and phonetics from Nahuatl and Hñähñu, also known as the Otomí language.

His music also combines wider aspects of linguistics and human speech, mathematical models (series, patterns, algorithms, etc.), and models coming from bird vocalization and nonverbal communication.

== Musicologist ==
As musicologist, the publications of Pareyon contributed to recognize aspects of the new music from Mexico in his own country and abroad, e.g. in the explanation and extension of Julio Estrada's work (see McHard 2006, 2008:264). Accordingly, his work is quoted, as early as from 2000, by international compilations about the music of Mexico (see e.g. Olsen & Sheehy 2000:108; Nattiez et al. 2006:125, 137, 1235) and specialised literature (see e.g. Brenner 2000:177; Madrid & Moore 2013:94, 126). The Preface to the book Musicians' Migratory Patterns: American-Mexican Border Lands starts with the following statement:

"In Pareyon's Diccionario Enciclopédico de Música en México (2007), the phrase Estados Unidos de América appears 1,338 times. Pareyon's two-volume compendium totaling 1,134 pages is a paramount bibliographic recount of the lives and musical experiences of Mexican musicians and artists from preColumbian times to today. The artistic, academic, cultural, social, and economic ties of Mexican musicians to the United States cannot be simply understood by such a significant number; however, this mere statistical value no doubt informs us about the strong musical relationships between the two countries."

— M. Rodriguez, editor, Musicians' Migratory Patterns, 2021.

=== Systematic Musicology ===
In the field of systematic musicology, Pareyon's book On Musical Self-Similarity (Helsinki, 2011) predicts the role of analogy as one of the capital issues for future musicology and cognitive science, foreseeing conclusions of Hofstadter & Sander's Surfaces and Essences (2013). According to Curtis Roads (2015:316), On Musical Self-Similarity "is an intriguing treatise in which repetition is generalized to several modes of self-similarity that are ubiquitous in musical discourse.". The book is frequently referenced in monographs, journals and dissertations, mainly in the fields of representation of temporal groups and semigroups, machine learning and human-machine hybrid composition, non-linear cognitive studies of musical processes, neural dynamic programming, and self-repetition algorithmic modelling.

=== Textiles understood as Musical Patterns ===
Grandson of a textile worker from La Experiencia (Zapopan, Jalisco), Pareyon’s article “Traditional patterns and textures as values for meaningful automatization in music”, published in Finland, in 2010, is a seminal work proposing that textiles and traditional fabrics, generalized as frieze group patterns, may be and indeed are instructive as musical contents. This idea inspired a PhD dissertation from Durham University (2016), and contributed to a framework for systematizing the catalog of harmonic styles developed as an interactive immersion by the University of Science and Technology of China USTC (Huawei Technologies Co Ltd). A clarifying chapter in these terms appears entitled “A matter of complementarity” within On Musical Self-Similarity, pages 458–461.

=== Music as an Ecology ===
Another pioneering writing is “The Ecologic Foundations of Stylistics in Music and in Language”, published by the Aristotle University and the University of Edinburgh, in 2009. There, the conclusions lead to conceiving culture as an intersection between the semiosphere and the ecological niche’s complexity:

"In the wake of considering style as a result of dynamic relations in music and in language, it might be questioned whether its cycles are involved into greater systems of biological complexity. (...) This would explain at least general aspects of attraction, repulsion and bifurcation in musical constraints, preferences and correctness rules."

— G. Pareyon

The latter cannot be disengaged from the political and social dimensions of music, as Pareyon states at the end of another paper, “How Music Can Signify Politics in the Postmodern Era” (Helsinki, 2011):

"Musical nationalism, and postmodern corporatism equally play a role in colonisation and ecological deterioration, making trivial what was sacred or traditional in its original context. In musicology, a big question arises: can composers such as Chávez, Bartók, Sibelius, or Villa-Lobos, be judged as conquerors of local traditions, for the sake of the expansion of Classical music? Or are they rather cathartic agents of musical synthesis, attempting to save diversity in spite of an unavoidable, progressive unitarism as a process of cultural self-transformation?"

— G. Pareyon

Finally, this idea of diversity of music is developed in a later book, Resonancias del abismo como nación (in Spanish, 2021), as follows (page 372):

"Faced with the disaster of monoculture, the metaphor of bioecological disaster is concomitant: the rapid increase in the rate of destruction of languages, traditions and traditional ways of life, quickly replaced by a single way of existence, usually called “progress” or “development”, and inspired by the North American model of egotistical and irrational consumption of resources, in the midst of the cultural desolation that derives from the reproduction of this system, leads humanity towards a form of generalized poverty never seen before.”

— G. Pareyon

== Semiotician ==
Pareyon’s output in the field of semiotics is significant mainly through his capital contributions of polar semiotics, intersemiotic continuum and intersemiotic synecdoche.

=== Polar semiotics ===
Probably Pareyon's most important contribution, both to semiotics and musicology, is his construction of Polar semiotics (also Polar semiology) within the mathematical domain of Category theory. Thomas Sebeok’ famous statement the sign is bifacial (1976:117; with noticeable antecedent in Peircean semiotics) remained obscure in the context of interdisciplinary studies, until Pareyon's formal generalization, in a fashion that makes possible harmonizing cultural semiotics within a range of Group theory. This theorization has an impact on the methods for social history, as a bond between the abstract and the socially real and the pathos, since, as Pareyon concludes:

"The more important a concept does appear in the human mind and in social history, the more heterogeneousness of thoughts around it. This, which is a problem for classical philosophy, is the greatest virtue for the concepts of philosophy behind polar semiotics. Yoneda lemma facilitates this recognition for philosophy in general, and for musicology in particular."

— G. Pareyon

=== Intersemiotic continuum ===
Pareyon’s theorization on the intersemiotic continuum is an elaboration over Lotman (1984: 5–6) semiosphere and Sebeok semiotic continuum ($SC$). The latter expressed that "no semiotic system can exist or function unless it is ‘immersed in the semiotic continuum’—which is what Lotman terms the semiosphere". However, the $SC$ concept emphasizes the fact that there is no any gap along or across the sign network and its interpretant (of any sign). This is deeply related to the semiotic quiddity aliquid stat pro aliquo, conventionally translated and adapted to the terms: “[A sign is] everything that stands for something else". Furthermore, Kotov and Kull (2011:183) specifies that (The) "semiosphere can be described as a semiotic continuum, a heterogeneous yet bounded space that is in constant interaction with other similar structures.". Congruently, the intersemiotic continuum theory ($IC$ theory), introduced in chapter 3.8.1. of Pareyon’s On Musical Self-Similarity, expands this notion to the principle that “there is no any gap along or across the semiotic dimensions and its interpretants". Subsumed within the field of formal categories, this theorization adopted the rule of satisfying the Snake lemma. Subsequently, this theorization strengthened the complementary concepts of intersemiotic synecdoche and polar semiotics. Within the first years after the publication of these concepts in On Musical Self-Similarity (2011), the $IC$ theory was extended to several scientific disciplines, mainly in Eastern Europe and Russia.

=== Intersemiotic synecdoche ===
The classical concept of synecdoche, in which a term for a part of something is used to refer to the whole, or vice versa, here is embedded into a multidimensional semiotic depth. Thus, whether "classical synecdoche" dwells within rhetorics and speech theoretical contexts, the intersemiotic synecdoche is the analogous operation, transversal to $n$ number of semiotic dimensions. It is, also and necessarily, a subgroup of the intersemiotic continuum wholeness. Among other features, this framework expands the approach to abstract synesthesia in different conceptual domains, for instance, connecting partial codes or signs to complete codes or sign systems of potentially infinite semiotic varieties. A first order example would be as follows: let $color$_{$k$} be part of pitch $p$_{$j$} which in turn makes part of a chord $ch$_{$i$} existent with specific timbre $Fs$_{ω} (i.e. Fourier spectrum) that represents specific combinatorics for a Dirichlet L-function, $L$. Thus, sumarizing:

$L(Fs) = \frac{ch(log)}{p(log)}$ ∝ $color_k.$

Although merely substituting a symbol by another symbol or a code by another parallel code obviously results trivial, when embedding this sort of relations as connected morphisms (see: Category theory), semiotics can be understood as the realm of signs, symbols and associated operations, characterizable as the ‘visible display’ (i.e. perception of the signs and signic processes: the ‘color’ in the previous example), in contrast with its transversal constraints (‘invisible’ or hidden to the senses). Nevertheless, both perceptible and imperceptible plots of signs integrate the same intersemiotic continuum (being ‘explicit’ the pars pro toto, and ‘implicit’ the toto pro pars).

== Books (selection in English) ==
- The Musical-Mathematical Mind: Patterns and Transformations (co-authorship). Berlin: Springer, 2017. ISBN 978-3-319-47336-9.
- On Musical Self-Similarity, Acta Semiotica Fennica 39: Approaches to Musical Semiotics Series, Imatra, & University of Helsinki Press (Yliopistopaino Helsinki), 2011.
- RILM Music Encyclopedias : Diccionario Enciclopedico de Musica en Mexico, UP, Guadalajara, 2006. Vol. 1: . Vol. 2:
- Aspects of Order in Language and in Music, Royal Conservatoire, The Hague, 2004.

== Articles / Chapters (selection) ==
- "Cognitive Semantics, Image, and Creative Imagination", Infrasonica, No. 9, oct. 2023.
- "Music as a Carbon Language: Clarifying Methods, Results, Fresh Data, and Perspectives”, MusMat – Brazilian Journal of Music and Mathematics. 7(2), sep. 2023; pp. 1–25. DOI: 10.46926/musmat.2023v7.1-25.
- "Teponazcuauhtla, or “Forest of Resonances" Mesoamerican Plot of Harmony", Journal of Mathematics and Music, 16(3), nov. 2022. DOI: 10.1080/17459737.2022.2131918
- "Three Open Questions from the Indigenous Epistemology, over Music and Mathematics in the Latin American 21st Century", MusMat – Brazilian Journal of Music and Mathematics, 6(1), jun. 2022; pp. 1–11. DOI: 10.46926/musmat.2022v6n1.1-11.
- "Music and Mathematics in Latin America: Major Developments in the Last 25 Years”, MusMat – Brazilian Journal of Music and Mathematics, 6(1), jun. 2022; pp. 12–47. DOI: 10.46926/musmat.2022v6n1.12-47.
- "Philosophical Sketches on Category Theory Applied to Music-Mathematical Polar Semiotics", MusMat – Brazilian Journal of Music and Mathematics, 4(2), dic. 2020; pp. 41–51. DOI: 10.46926/musmat.2020v4n2.41-51.
- "Wooden Idiophones: Classification Through Phase Synchronization Analysis” in (G. Pareyon & S. Pina-Romero, eds.) The Musical-Mathematical Mind. Berlin: Springer, 2017 (231–241). ISBN 978-3-319-47336-9.
- “Patterns of materiality/immateriality: dialectics in epistemology under the new scientific paradigm” in (E. Reyes-Garcia, P. Châtel-Innocenti, K. Zreik, eds.), Archiving and Questioning Immateriality. Proceedings of the 5th Computer Art Congress. Paris: Europia, 2016 (57–70). ISBN 979-10-90094-23-9.
- “Music as Carbon Language: A Mathematical Analogy and its Interpretation in Biomusicology”, MusMat – Brazilian Journal of Music and Mathematics, (1)1, ISSN 2526-3757, MusMat Research Group (ed.), dic. 2016; pp. 25–43.
- "Traditional patterns and textures as values for meaningful automatization in music", Musiikki : Suomen musiikkitieteellinen seura, 40(2), Helsinki, 2010; pp. 53–59.
- "The Role of Abduction in Self-Similarity: On the Peircean Concept of the Map of the Map” in (E. Tarasti, ed.) Abstracts of the International Summer School for Semiotic and Structural Studies : 25 Years Semiotics in Imatra, Imatra, Finland, 2010.
- "The Ecologic Foundations of Stylistics in Music and in Language" in Proceedings of the 2nd International Conference for PhD Music Students, Aristotle University (Thessaloniki) & University of Edinburgh, 2009.
- "A Fractal Conjecture of Language. A Proposal for a Cognitive Frame of Semiotics", Proceedings of the 9th IASS-AIS International Congress of Semiotics, Helsinki and Imatra, 2007.

== Sources ==
- Brenner, Helmut (2000). Juventino Rosas. His Life, His Work, His Time, Harmonie Park Press, Michigan.
- Lotman, Juri M. "O semiosfere" (1984). Sign Systems Studies (Trudy po znakovym sistemam), 17: 5–23.
- Kotov, Kaie, & Kalevi Kull. 2011. "Semiosphere Is the Relational Biosphere" in (C. Emeche & K. Kull, eds.) Towards a Semiotic Biology. London: Imperial College Press.
- Madrid, Alejandro L. & Robin D. MOORE (2013). Danzón: Circum-Caribbean Dialogues in Music and Dance, Oxford University Press, Oxford.
- McHard, James L. (2008). The Future of Modern Music, Iconic Press, 3rd edition (on page 272 Pareyon is quoted as a source for the interpretation of Julio Estrada's musical thought).
- Nattiez, Jean-Jacques, Margaret Bent, Rossana Dalmonte (2005). Enciclopedia della Musica. Torino: Einaudi.
- Olsen, Dale A. & Daniel E. Sheehy, The Garland Handbook of Latin American Music (2nd ed.). New York: Routledge.
- Roads, Curtis (2015). Composing Electronic Music: A New Aesthetic. Oxford: Oxford University Press.
- Rovner, Anton (2005). "Dresdener Tage des Zeitgenossisches Musik", New Music Connoisseur, 13, fall/winter.
- Solomos, Makis (2004). "Gabriel Pareyon: Chocs et proportions” in III Forum International de Jeunes Compositeurs, Societé d’Auteurs et Compositeurs de Musique. Paris: Ministère de la Culture.

== See also ==
List of musicologists Mexicayotl
