= Xōchiquetzal =

Aztec deity

Xochiquetzal
- Goddess of Beauty, Love, and Flowers; Protector of Women
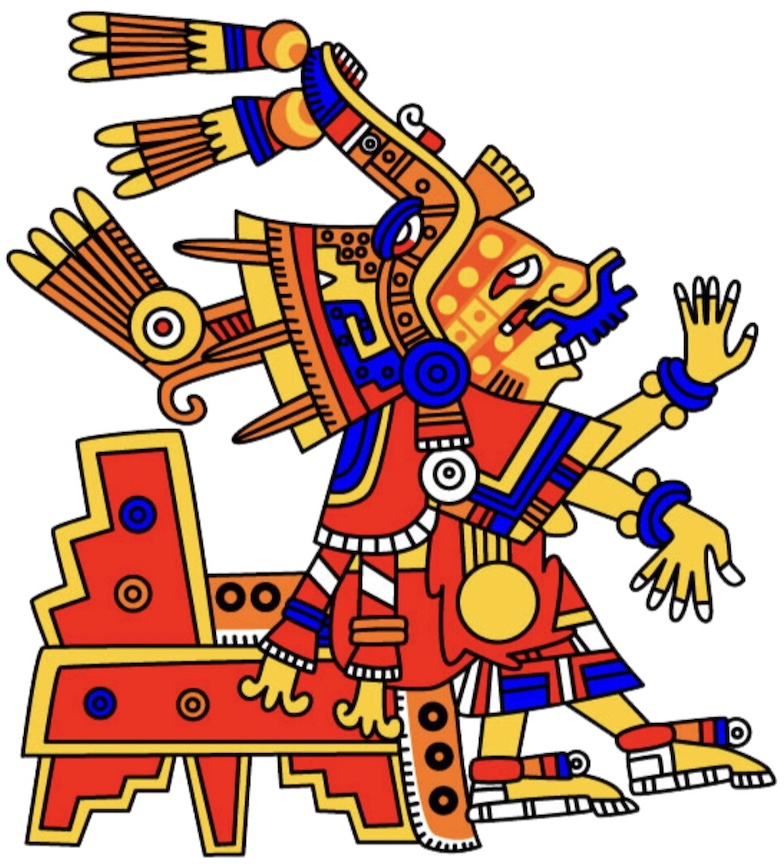
- Xōchiquetzal as depicted in the Codex Borgia.
- Other names: Xochiquetzalli, Xochitl, Macuixochiquetzalli
- Abode: Tamoanchan (Codex Ríos)
- Gender: Female
- Region: Mesoamerica
- Ethnic group: Aztec, Tlaxcaltec, Toltec (Nahua)
- Festivals: Tlaxochimaco, Miccailhuitontli

Genealogy
- Parents: Xochitlicue (Codex Ramírez)
- Siblings: Xochipilli
- Consort: • Tlaloc (Codex Ríos) • Tezcatlipoca (Codex Ríos) • Piltzintecuhtli (Codex Zumarraga) • Cinteotl (Codex Le Tellier) • Xiuhtecuhtli (Codex Florentine)
- Children: Cinteotl (Codex Zumarraga) With Piltzintecuhtli

Equivalents
- Greek: Aphrodite
- Maya: Ixchel (God O)

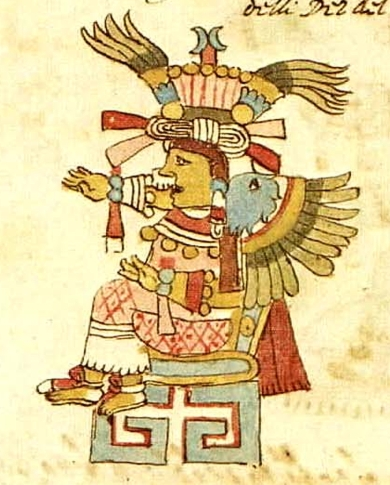
Xochiquetzal, from the Codex Rios, 16th century.

In Aztec mythology, Xochiquetzal (Classical Nahuatl: Xōchiquetzal [ʃoːt͡ʃiˈket͡sal]), also called Ichpochtli (Classical Nahuatl: Ichpōchtli [it͡ʃˈpoːt͡ʃt͡ɬi], meaning "maiden"), is a goddess associated with fertility, beauty, and love, serving as a protector of young mothers and a patroness of pregnancy, childbirth, and the crafts practiced by women such as weaving and embroidery. In pre-Hispanic Maya culture, a similar figure is Goddess I.

== Name ==
The name Xōchiquetzal is a compound of xōchitl ("flower") and quetzalli ("precious feather; quetzal tail feather"). In Classical Nahuatl morphology, the first element in a compound modifies the second and thus the goddess' name can literally be taken to mean "flower precious feather" or "flower quetzal feather". Her alternative name, Ichpōchtli, corresponds to a personalized usage of ichpōchtli ("maiden, young woman").

== Description ==
Unlike several other figures in the complex of Aztec female earth deities connected with agricultural and sexual fecundity, Xochiquetzal is always depicted as an alluring and youthful woman, richly attired and symbolically associated with vegetation and in particular flowers.

By connotation, Xochiquetzal is also representative of human desire, pleasure, and excess, appearing also as patroness of artisans involved in the manufacture of luxury items.

Worshipers wore animal and flower masks at a festival, held in her honor every eight years. Her husband was Tlaloc until Tezcatlipoca kidnapped her and she was forced to marry him. At one point, she was also married to Centeotl and Xiuhtecuhtli.

Anthropologist Hugo Nutini identifies her with the Virgin of Ocotlan in his article on patron saints in Tlaxcala.

== Worship ==
The worship of Xochiquetzal along with Tlaloc partook in the festival of Hueypachtli. During this festival Xochiquetzal was honored and also offered a variety of gifts consisting of flower offerings, drinking and fornications. A young woman was chosen to be a ixiptlatli which impersonated the goddess and was decapitated, flayed and her skin was worn by a selected man who would then weave as part of a representation of "the gender ambiguity embodied in the cult of lunar deities".

== See also ==
- Ahuiateteo
- Ahwahnee
- Xochicuicatl cuecuechtli
- Xochipilli
