= Ahwahnee =

Ahwahnee may refer to:

== Places ==
- Ahwahnee Hotel, Yosemite, California, United States
- Ahwahnee, California, United States; an unincorporated community
- Yosemite National Park, California, United States; the region formerly known as "Ahwahnee"

== Other uses ==
- Ahwahnee (Aztec culture), a type of entertainer in the Aztec world
- Ahwahnechee, the Ahwahnee people of the Yosemite Valley, a Native American people of California, United States
