= Carlos Sandoval =

Mexican-German composer and multimedia artist

- Born: Carlos Sandoval Mendoza; September 6, 1956; Mexico City, Mexico
- Occupation: Composer / Visual Artist

Carlos Sandoval Mendoza (born 1956, Mexico City) is a Mexican/German multidiscipline artist mostly recognized for his work joining technology and a Gestalt approach to the art of music composition, multi channel video, time-lapsed performance, AI-assisted art and Ink-Pen Drawing. Michael Zwenzner describes him as a "Socio-critical magician of the extended-multimedia instrumental theater." On more recent Sandoval's work, Davood wrote: "[...] Each piece, whether sound or video art, music composition or intricate drawings, reflects an artist who is as much a global citizen as he is a silent observer of the internal human odyssey".

== Life and work ==
Sandoval was born in an archetypal barrio in downtown Mexico City. Since his childhood, he was exposed to harrowing social and cultural conditions which were later reflected in his work. In 2009 he became a German citizen and now holds a dual Mexican-German passport/nationality. Having abandoned his music studies at Escuela Nacional de Música UNAM 1976-79, Sandoval went on to study composition, analysis and theory, privately, with Julio Estrada (1985–90). He also assisted and took part in private sessions with several other composers. In Europe he learned Piano tuning and building at the Bösendorfer Klavier Fabrik in Vienna (1980–82). This stint radically changed his outlook on sound in general. Later on, as a photographer and videographer he studied with Sirgo (Mexico), Fabri (Austria), and Fathi (Germany). Sandoval is internationally active. From 1999 until 2018, he was a fellow of the SNCA which is one of the highest recognitions awarded to Mexican artists by the Mexican Government. He also worked as an assistant to Conlon Nancarrow (1991–94).

Sandoval identifies himself with diverse Edmund Husserl's phenomenological concepts like Lifeworld ("In whatever way we may be conscious of the world as universal horizon, as coherent universe of existing objects, we, each "I-the-man" and all of us together, belong to the world as living with one another in the world; and the world is our world, valid for our consciousness as existing precisely through this 'living together.'), "Empathy and Subjectivity" (the subjectivity of others, as well as our intersubjective engagement with them), Evidence ("the successful presentation of something whose truth becomes manifest in the evidencing itself"), Intuition ("...having a cup of coffee in front of you, for instance, seeing it, feeling it, or even imagining it: these are all "filled intentions", and the object is then intuited") and Intentionality of consciousness ("the power of minds to be about, to represent, or to stand for, things, properties and states of affairs"). All these concepts are linked in Sandoval's work with an ethical use of technology, (or Technoethics: using technology not just without renouncing humanism but stressing and empowering Humanism). He has been invited to take part in numerous events and contemporary music festivals around Western countries. He is also the author of multiple articles and speculative essays about music. During (and after) the COVID-19 pandemic, he is focused mainly on ink-pen drawing.

== Early work – Estradian-Xenakian period (1987-1990) ==
His early work can be identified with Julio Estrada's Techniques and the Xenakian school and includes the use of Cartesian graphics representing sonic trajectories and its evolutions, multi parametrics (utilizing several simultaneous performance and compositional resources in a single line or stave) as well as internal sonic imagination analysis. "Ginantria", for cello solo, 1990, is the best example of this period. A number of out-of-catalogue pieces also belong to this stage:

- "Traepes", 1985, 4:58", Glissandi studies, made before his studies). Chamula harp and tuning forks.
- "Filos", 1987–89, 12:00" Chamber concert, never premiered.
- "Lomos", 1989, 7:35" UPIC System
- "Ginantria", 1990, 12:05" Violoncello.
- "Homenaje", 1991, 7:39" UPIC system

== Postmodern-Synthesis Period (1993-04) ==
In 1991 Sandoval met Conlon Nancarrow and began work as his assistant (1991–94). The influence of Nancarrow's music was strong at this time while some remains of Xenakian style were also present. Sandoval's musical thinking began to lose channelization. This lack of "school", "channelized impulse" or "Style" ("Style is just a super thin ham slice between your "freedom" and your own limitations" (Sandoval, 2009)) remained a characteristic of his work and can be easily identified with a radical postmodern approach. Besides this, it took Sandoval almost four years to assimilate and synthesize the influence of both Estrada and Nancarrow, apparently the polar opposites of one another but in fact both belonging to a Cartesian, rational, object-oriented way of thinking. Sandoval's music from this period is described well by the list of 16 postmodern music characteristics defined by Kramer (Kramer 2002, 16–17). Between 2002 and 2003, just prior to relocating to Germany, Sandoval published two of his "manifestos": "Imaginación, análisis y posmodernismo" and "De la fenomenología al ejercicio estético, o una apología del cinismo".

Still in Catalogue from the "Fellini Circus Series":

- "Slow piece for Player Piano", 1993, Player piano.
- "Fast Piece for Player Piano", 1993, 6:23" Player piano
- "Fast Piece for computer controlled acoustical instruments", 1994, 6:23", pf., xil., barrel organ, vib. and accordion.
- "La Pasión Según la Gente", 1999, 25:27" Indian Brass band, Cl, B.cl, percusión and tape
- "8to-01", 2000-01: Ca. 15:00", Flute, G FLute, Cl., B. Cl., Pf and string quitent.
- "CcMd-01", 2002, 13:47" String quartet and CD. Premiered by the Arditti String Quartet.
- "PfMd-01", 2001, 16:35", Piano and CD.
- "Pf-03", 2002, 7:49", Piano.
- "Bcl-01", 2002, 7:49", Bass Clarinet.
- "KPmd01", 2002–03, Ca. 15:00", Orchestra, piano and tape.
- "K-02" 2004, Ca. 10:.00", Orchestra and toy airplanes.
- "K-03" 2005, Ca. 9:.00", Orchestra.

Still in catalogue transition pieces:

- "Negative Study for Sensible Hands", 1996, Sensors on Hands, first gloves prototype.
- "Suite Antimodem", 1997, 50:00", ETC-ETC Ensemble. Bio-energetics, disposition and improvisation.
- "Pf-01", 1998, 7:58", Piano,
- "Pf-02", 1999, 7:49", (Huitzilac period) Piano,

== German Period 1 (2003-2007) ==
Carlos Sandoval moved to Berlin, Germany in September 2003. His first German project was "Mextoys", 2003–04, 80:00", commissioned by the Festival Eigenarten and the Culture Ministry in Hamburg and premiered at the city's prestigious Hochschule für Musik und Theater in Hamburg. This piece constituted a breakthrough in Sandoval's work: it was his first true "phenomenological" work, his first full multimedia piece, and his first work joining video and music into a single conceptual and constructive layer. This point marked Sandoval's departure from traditional score writing and deterministic thinking, towards developing either an experience-oriented connection to music and a Piagetian approach to animism towards music and life in general. Jean Piaget's theories of language as an object and the cognitive inability to distinguish the external world from one's psyche, still have a strong influence on Sandoval's work.

- "Mex-toys", 2003–04, three movements., 80:00", percussion, dance, video and tape. Scenes from videoclips projected during the performance are reenacted live by the musicians performing on stage.
- "The Birth of a Ship", 2006, 25:00", Ships as living organisms and percussion instruments. Lange Nacht der Museen, Senatsverwaltung für Wissenschaft, Forschung und Kultur, the Deutsches Technikmuseum Berlin and the TU Studio Berlin.
- "Die Schaukel", 2007, 3:08:06" Improvised ritual, sound installation, stage actions and live electronics. Bauhaus Naunynstr. Interaktion Festival, Initiative Neue Music, The Tilt.
- "Petenera", 2004, 11:50", guitar, toy guitar, tuning-fork, tape and stage action, in two movements. The guitarist becomes a mother, the toy guitar the baby.
- "Qu Vara", 2004, 10:14" trombone, water, saliva, tape and stage actions
- "Qu Trompa", 2007, 10:14" Trumpet, water, saliva, tape and stage actions

== German Period 2 (2006-2012) ==
While living in Berlin, Sandoval met a number of computer-science specialists and began developing work incorporating the use of sensors. His third "manifesto", published in Germany in 2009 interjects cultural, artistic and political values to the pure act of sonification via the use of technology. His work incorporating living trees, accelerometers and hands equipped with tactile sensors is based on random-picking software, and adds a mystical quality to the otherwise objective process of transduction of physical phenomena.

- "Sotavento", 2006, no duration. International network of sounding trees. Tree installation in Florence, Italy, Berlin, Germany and San Luis Potosí, Mexico. With the support of the TU electronic studio, Berlin, the GSLI in Florence and the Festival de San Luis in Mexico.
- "Baumberauschen", 2007, No duration. Three networked trees. Commissioned by the European Union's "Soziale Stadt" program, throughout the "Kunst : Identität" project.
- "The body", 2007 Gloves with sensors and a female body as a musical instrument, Ca 20:00". Commissioned by the "5+1 electroacoustic music festival" in Berlin. TU Elektronisches Musik Studio.
- "Mosaicos" 1 and 2", 2008, Ca. 20:00" Chamber ensemble, any instruments and gloves with tactile sensors. Commissioned by the ensemble Mosaik.
- "Die basta-Zeiten sind vorbei", 2008, Ca. 22:00" Chamber ensemble, any instruments and gloves with tactile sensors. Commissioned by the ensemble Mosaik.
- "Baumberauschen 2", 2009, Sound installation. Trees with accelerometers. Commissioned by the European Union's "Soziale Stadt" program.
- "Klangkaskaden", 2010, Sound installation. Trees with accelerometers. Commissioned by the European Union's "Soziale Stadt" program.
- "8to-02", 2010–11, 6:22", String quartet, 2 trombones, 2 double basses.
- "The forest is above the man", in four independent parts: 2008-09 Part I: "The myth of Globalization", open duration. Fl, Ob, Cl, Bss, Trp 1 and 2, Sx ten, Sx Bar, Trb1 and 2, Piano and perc. Part II: "The myth of Alienation", open duration. Fl, Ob, Cl, Percussion, Piano, String quintet and piano.
- "The forest is above the man", in four independent parts: Part III: 2009-10 "The myth of lacking of time", open duration Fl, Cl, Ob, Bs, P, String quartet Percussions 1 and 2. Part IV: "The myth of relativity", open duration, string quartet.
- "The forest is above the man, Epilogue", 2012, 12:00", two tubas, two trombones and tape.
- "The Mexican Wave", 2012, 9:00", string quintet (from one to five musicians pro stave)and tape.

== German Period 3 (2014-19) and CoVid 19 pandemic Period (2020-21) ==
Indoor Pieces

- "Maquina Latina", 2014, Ca. 15:00", for Piano, Time-lapse video and Tape. An Ernst Surberg commission kindly supported by the Sistema Nacional de Creadores (FONCA, México). Premiered November 2013 at the Piano +, Imatronic Festival of Electronic Music", ZKM, Karlsruhe.
- "Teleprompter", 2015, Ca. 2:54", for soloists ensemble (Ob, Cl, detuned Keyboard, Perc., Viola and Violin), video (with same performers, cloned) and tape. Commissioned by the German NDR's for the Festival "Das Neue Werk". Premiered at the "Resonanzraum" St. Pauli, in Hamburg by the Ensemble Mosaik. The second version kindly supported by the Sistema Nacional de Creadores, FONCA. Premiere at the Akademie der Künste Berlin, by the Ensemble Mosaik.
- "AntiLegos Part One", 2015, Ca. 2:54", for detuned keyboard, video (with the same performer, cloned) and Tape. Commissioned by the Ensemble Mosaik. Premiered at the Donaueschinger Musiktage 2015.
- "AntiLegos Part two", 2015, Ca. 4:18" for Oboe and Violin, Video (with same performers, cloned) and tape. Commissioned by the Ensemble Mosaik. Premiered at the Donaueschinger Musiktage 2015.
- "AntiLegos Part three", 2015, Ca. 4:40" for Bb Clarinet, Bass Clarinet and Viola, Video (with same performers, cloned) and tape. Commissioned by the Ensemble Mosaik. Premiered at the Donaueschinger Musiktage 2015.
- "The Mexican National Anthem as I Recall it From my Childhood", 2016, Ca. 15:30", for Ensemble, soprano, 2-channels video, tape, and flag conductor. Commissioned by Carlos Prieto, for the CTM-Berlin festival 2016.
- "The Six Lost Songs", 2018, Ca. 14:46", Ondes Martenot, Percussion, Double-bass, and tape. Commissioned by the Americas Society.
- "Die Tränen der Dinge ", 2018, Ca. 16:00", soloists Ensemble, video, (Percussion and Accordion obbligati). Commissioned by the Siemens Stiftung through the ensemble mosaik. Premiered in 2018,
- "Kammlagen", 2019, Ca. 70:00", Church Organ, analog electronic and soprano. Financially supported by the INM-Berlin. With Guido Henneboehl. Premiered in 2019 at the St. Marie Liebfrauen Church, in Berlin
- "Biberdamm Assut", 2019, Ca. 15:00", Trio: Keyboard, Cello and Violin, Ensemble Mosaik's Commission Premiered at the Acker Stadt Palace, Berlin.

Outdoor pieces/performances

The first two pieces are collaborative-works (with mariana Castillo deball) that show "[...] the shifting of the artistic focus from objects and installations, to the work with subjects and their creative participation, opening the same creative door for both, the artists and the performers."

- "Viertel Nach Schatten", 2016, Ca. 120:00", for Brassband, church bells and performers, commissioned by the Grazer Kunst Verein, Graz, 2016.
- "Fatalismo Mágico, ópera sobre el deseo y la nostalgia en cuatro actos", 2017, no duration, for performers and sound recordist. Commissioned by the Fundación Alumnos 47, Proyecto Líquido Deseo, Ciudad de México, 2017.
- "Klavierstrasse", 2018, no duration, for walking citizens and a staged piano. With the support of the Kiezanker, Familienzentrum and berliner-klavier.de, Berlin.

Pandemic Period

- "Hearing in Bed", 2020/21, Ca. 17:00", For ensemble and offline video. Commission by LIMINAR and Ensemble Contrechams. Premiered Online in 2021.

== Video works ==
- "Se fueron los pájaros" (Video, Color, HD, 8:07", Anti-soundscape for blind people, Germany 2016).
- "Perchtenlauf in Klotzenberg" (Video, Color, 4:3, 14:02", A documentary on Alps Traditional culture Production: Grazer Kunst Verein, Germany-Austria 2016).
- "Rabbit-score played by Christian Vogel" (Video, BW, HD, 3:57", Own-Score performance, Germany 2015)
- "Lips" (Video, Color, HD, 13:57", edited and modified voice improvisations by Almut Khüne, Germany 2011).
- "Hidden 2" (Video, Color, HD, 4:57", featuring Charlote Grude, Germany 2011).
- "Ursula" (Video, Color & BW, HD, 30:00", Germany, 2010).
- "Hidden 1" (3:29", Color, Video HD, Mexico-Germany, 2010).
- "Doña Soco, her Mother and the chicken. Three non-fiction portraits" (16:05", Video, Color, Mexico-Germany, 2003–09).
- "Dream" (6:05", Video, Mexico-Germany, 2001–2009).
- "La Pasión según la gente" (18:05", video, Color, Mexico 2001–2003).
- "Mextoys 1" (5:00", video, Color, Mexico 2004).
- "Mextoys 2" (5:00", video, color, Mexico 2004).

== Discography ==
- "Fatalismo Mágico: Ópera sobre el deseo y la nostalgia en cuatro actos", 2018, Double EP, Vinil, limited 100-copies edition, producer: Fundación Alumnos 47, Mexico.
- "O cigarro de Möbius", 2013, in The Marvellous Transatlantic, Ápice AP 002. Collaboration with the Mexican anti-ensemble Genración Espontánea. Mexico.
- "Petenera", 2011, in Pages acoustiques, Christelle Sery, Guitar. SACM, XTL001/1, France.
- "PfMd 01, por piano et band", 2009, in 17 Mars 2009, Théâtre d'Orléans, Concours International de piano d'Orleans. France
- "Liz-Mix" Electroacoustic piece, 2009, in Ready Media: hacia una arqueologia de los medios y la invencion en Mexico, Laboratorio de Arte Alameda, Mexico City,
- "Chillida", 2004, continuous loop, electroacoustic piece using a never-repeating simultaneous 2-CDs looping, in Danilo Veras, puntos Comas Acentos Palabras , DVD, Facultad de Arquitectura, Palmera Films, Universidad Veracruzana, Mexico
- "La Pasión Según la Gente", 2002, in La Pasión según la gente y otras obras, Quindecim, PACMyC, Sireña, monographic CD, Mexico
- "Homenaje", 2002, in De vez en vez, SACM, Quindecim, track 4, Mexico
- "Fast Piece", 1994, in Donaueschinger MusikTage 1994, Col Legno Produktion, WWE-3CD-31882, track 1, Germany.

== Writings ==
- "Una visión del tiempo: Conlon Nancarrow" In Spanish, La Tempestad 115, pp 64–67, ISSN 1405-6895, Mexico City, October 2016.
- "Un Antipaisaje sonoro" Interview in Spanish, La Tempestad, Online Arts Magazine, Mexico City, September 2016.
- "Sobre Nacho Baca" Spanish. A text for the CD "Chamber Music", by Ignacio Baca Lobera, Cero Records CDFL-1715", July 2015.
- "Cien Años de Nancarrow" Spanish, La Tempestad, Arts Magazine, Mexico City, December 2012.
- "Heimat? Identität?" German, Neue Zeitschrift für Musik, p.p. 40-45. The German translation of "Composición y Colonialismo hoy?". Germany 2009.
- "Composición y colonialismo hoy?" Spanisch, Pauta, Music Magazine, 2008.
- "Música electrónica en vivo: gesto, inexpresividad y cinismo en la música del siglo XXI" Spanish, Pauta, 100, pp. 37–47, 2006.
- "De la fenomenología al ejercicio estético, o una apología del cinismo" Spanisch, Artelugio 2002, versión revisada y publicada en Pauta, 2005.
- "Imaginación, análisis y posmodernismo" Spanisch, Artelugio 2002; (versión revisada, Pauta, 2005).
- "Suena el tambor, ladran los perros", Spanish, in La pasión según la gente, booklet, 2001, Quindecim Recordings
- "Nancarrow, Samuel Conlon", Spanisch, Diccionario de la Música Española e Hispanoame-ricana, Madrid 2000.
- "Estrada, Julio", Spanisch, Diccionario de la Música Española e Hispanoamericana, Madrid 2000.
- "Conlon + Tiempo = Nancarrow", Spanish, Mexico City, Pauta, Music Magazine, 50–51, pp. 148–178. 1994.
- "Música Nueva en México", Spanish, Cultural supplement "La Comunidad", 177, Newspaper La Opinión, Los Angeles, 1983.
- "La nueva Canción", Spanish Cultural supplement "La Comunidad", 152, Newspaper La Opinión, Los Angeles 1983.
