= Ahwahnee (Aztec culture) =

Aztec name for type of female entertainer

Ahwahnee (Enchanter Young-Woman, also spelled ahuiani in Spanish sources), in the Aztec world, is the name for the female young entertainers who act as hostesses and whose skills include performing various arts such as music, dance, games and conversation, mainly to entertain male customers, usually Aztec warriors. The Ahwahnees patroness is the goddess Xochiquetzal, symbol of fertility, beauty, and female sexual power (including pregnancy and childbirth), and the crafts practised by women such as weaving and embroidery.

== Etymology ==
The name ahwahnee comes from Utian and Nahuatl languages ahwwahnee, ahuia or ahweeya, which John Bierhorst (1985:657, 730) translates as "good smelling". The Ahwahnees were typically educated since their childhood, to be pleasant to others, metaphorically "good smelling"; a metaphor also directly related to Xochiquetzal and her symbolic relationship with blossoms and the Earth's rebirth.

== Presence in Modern Culture ==
Also it is interesting that the word ahwahnee, as a Californian toponym, is derived from the Southern Sierra Miwok word awwo which, in English, means "mouth." This is not a mere coincidence, since the Miwok is an Utian language, and associates this word with the concept of breathing (and then to smelling). Furthermore, the Aztec ahwahnees were educated to frequently opening their mouths for singing, elegantly speaking, and smiling (smile was a magic feature performed by them, in order to make Mictlantecuhtli be away from people, avoiding, so, facing death; see Johansson, 2006). Three young ahwahnees can be seen in the opera Xochicuicatl cuecuechtli (2012).

== See also ==
- Ahuiateteo
- Xochiquetzal
- Xochicuicatl cuecuechtli
