= Polar semiotics =

Concept in the science of signs

Polar semiotics (or Polar semiology) is a concept in the field of semiotics, which is the science of signs.

The most basic concept of polar semiotics can be traced in the thought of Roman Jakobson, when he conceptualized binary opposition as a relationship that necessarily implies some other relationship of conjunction and disjunction. A simple example is the binary symmetry between polar qualities that belong to a same category, such as high / low, in coordination with other types of categories, for example the presence or absence of a pitch. With further development, this same idea is represented in the so-called Greimasian square, attributed to Algirdas Julius Greimas, and which is an adaptation of Aristotle’s old logical square, used by classical philosophers such as Descartes and Spinoza, among others, to try to support empirical demonstrations. As Chandler (2017) states: “There is an apparently inbuilt dualism in our attempts to understand our perception and cognition of the world. We even see the world as a thing apart from us: the modern polarity of subject and object that causes the world to retreat forever into a veil of illusion.”.

== The concept introduced into biosemiotics ==
It is due to Thomas Sebeok the adaptation of the aforementioned concept, to imply that there are systems and dynamics of opposite symmetry, that at the same time are complementary in manifold ecological processes and ecological niches as Jakob von Uexküll had described them under the concept of Umwelt:

" In the web of nature, plants are, above all, producers [...] The polar opposites of plants are the fungi, nature’s decomposers."

— Thomas Sebeok, Introduction to Semiotics, 2021: 29.

Sebeok suggests that this notion goes beyond mere subjectivity, as the association of oppositions and complements might seem in the RYB color model, used, for example, to understand the colorimetric relationships between flowers and pollinators. In fact, as Sebeok puts it, “the sign is bifaced” (1976: 117; see also Spinks, 1991: 29). The sign is, therefore, an instrument for cutting and producing symmetry that generates perspective and feeds the perception of externalized world through a self-conscious perceiver. Notice, also, that the concept of symmetry here employed, may also involve a manifold potential of asymmetry or simple antisymmetry, multiple antisymmetry, and permutational symmetry (see, for example, the conceptualization of binarism and asymmetry as conceived by Kotov & Kull, 2011:183).

== Formalization in Category theory ==
Until the first two decades of the 21st century, the concept of polar semiotics was loosely linked to the broader notion of category. Formalization of polar semiotics in the mathematical field of Category theory is due to Gabriel Pareyon (“Philosophical Sketches”, 2020), where the semiotic ‘pole’ is interpreted as the singularity of a function, which is neither removable nor essential to the function (as in fact ‘pole’ is defined in Mathematical analysis). Vectors that contribute to the definition of the semiotic set and scope of signification in a corresponding category of signs emanate or are traced from this polar singularity. The theoretical context to bring semiotics to the field of mathematics is based on Peirce’s semiotics. In this case, polar semiotics constitutes a useful tool in computational science, to characterize sign systems even in the so-called natural language and artistic language, as systems of categories submerged in contexts of the objects of the category of functors that submerge them, as it is postulated by the Yoneda lemma. Pareyon’s formalization of a generalized cohomology : $G = \langle s|T\rangle$ among any kind of subgroups ($s$) operating within a same topological space ($T$), where $G$ stands for group, $s$ for “symbolic system” (i.e. language), and $T$ also intends the “semiotic continuum” as a self-coherent map, surpasses the pseudo-problem of simple binarism as (un)translatability of a code, hitherto understood by the structuralist tradition, as criticized by Lorusso (2015) and Lenninger (2018):

The crucial point in the description of the notion of code here is the claim that it must not be interpreted as a one-to-one information key and cannot rest with the description of being traced via bi-polar categories, as in Levi-Strauss’ (1979) oppositional pairs or Greimas’ (1987) semes.

The referred formalization of polar semiotics allows, consequently, a morphism to build a one-to-one codal coherence for an intersemiotic translation (i.e. the conversion of a sign system within its semiotic regime, into another system within another, distinct, semiotic regime), as described by Jakobson, and constitutes a theoretical generalized framework for ekphrasis in its widest semiotic scope. Although the concept of ekphrasis usually is constrained within the field of arts, this framework extends semiotics competence to a crossover theorization among the arts and the sciences.

== Sources ==
- Chandler, Daniel. 2017. Semiotics: The Basics. London: Routledge.
- Greimas, A., J. 1987. On meaning: Selected writings in semiotic theory. Minneapolis: University of Minnesota Press.
- Iliff, Alan James. 2018. Charles S. Peirce's Mathematical Logic and Philosophy, Boston: Docent Press.
- Jakobson, Roman. 1992. Verbal Art, Verbal Sign, Verbal Time (ed. Krystyna Pomorska and Stephen Rudy), 1985.
- Kotov, Kaie, and Kalevi Kull. 2011. “Semiosphere Is the Relational Biosphere” in (C. Emmeche & K. Kull, eds.) Towards a Semiotic Biology. London: Imperial College Press.
- Lenninger, Sara. 2018. “Culture in the layers of contemporary discourses and historical archives: A review of Anna Maria Lorusso’s Cultural Semiotics”. Public Journal of Semiotics, 8 (1): 67-77.
- Lévi-Strauss, C. (1979). La voie des masques: édition revue, augmentée, et rallongée de Trois excursions. Paris: Plon.
- Lorusso, A., M. (2015). Cultural semiotics: For a cultural perspective in semiotics. London: Palgrave Macmillan.
- Pareyon, Gabriel. 2020. “Philosophical Sketches on Category Theory Applied to Music-Mathematical Polar Semiotics”, MusMat - Brazilian Journal of Music and Mathematics, vol. 4, no. 2; pp. 41–51. https://doi.org/10.46926/musmat.2020v4n2.41-51.
- Sebeok, T. 2001. The Study of Signs. In: Sebeok, T. Signs: An Introduction to Semiotics. Toronto: University of Toronto Press, pp. 25–38.
- Spinks, C.W. 1991. Ch. 3. The Myth of Polarity: A Perennial Problem of Semiotics, in (C.W. Spinks, author) Semiosis, Marginal Signs and Trickster, New York: Palgrave MacMillan, pp. 55–73. https://doi.org/10.1007/978-1-349-11663-8_4
