= Anton Rovner =

Russian-American composer

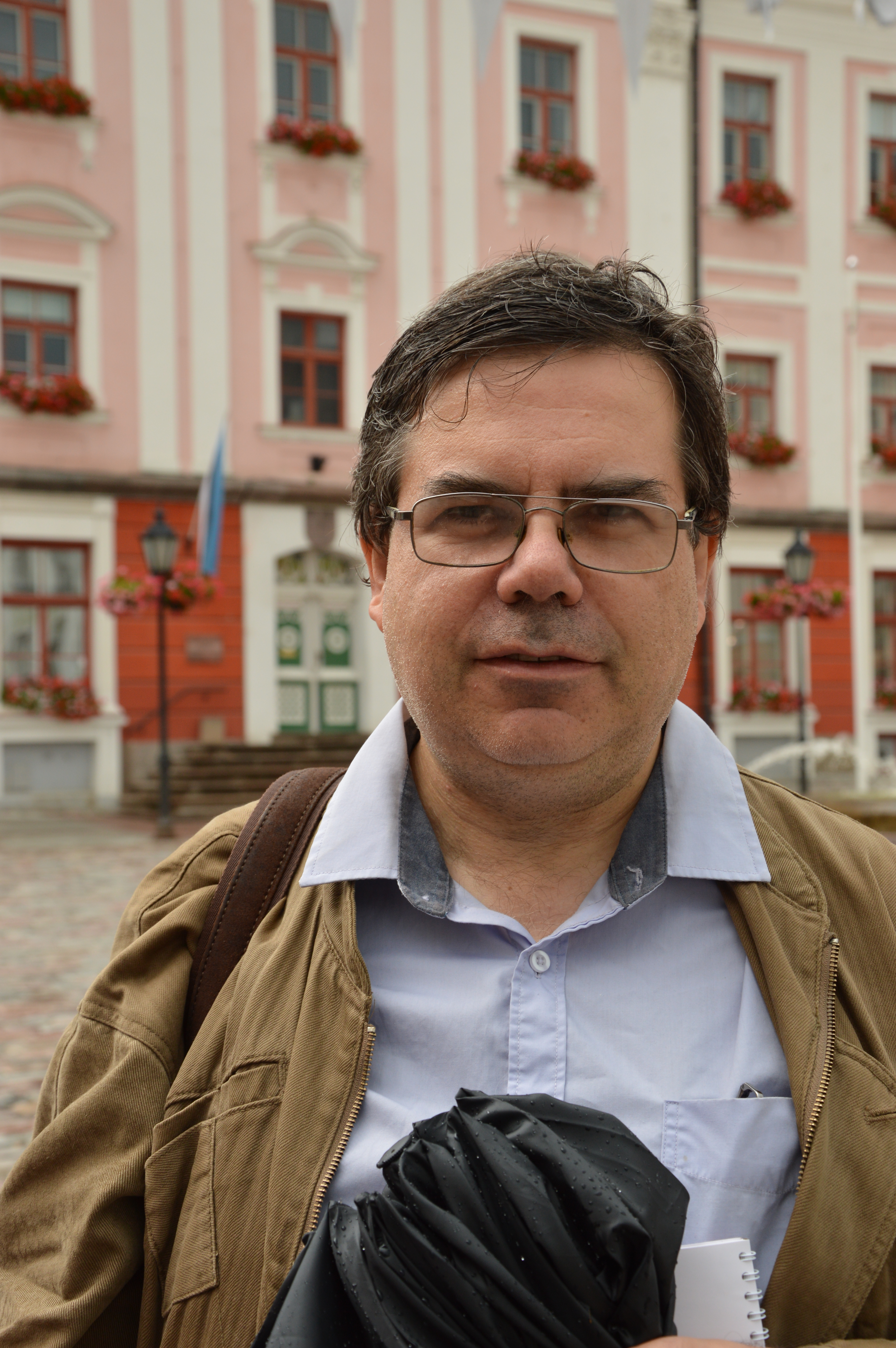
Anton Rovner in Tartu in 2019

Anton Rovner (Russian: Антон Аркадьевич Ровнер; born 28 June 1970) is a Russian-American composer, music critic and theorist.

== Life ==
Anton Rovner's grandfather was Jewish, his grandmother was Russian belonged to Russian Orthodox Church. Anton Rovner's father was the Russian philosopher Arkady Rovner. His mother, Victoria Andreeva, was a Russian writer, poet and translator. In 1974 they emigrated to the United States. He studied piano at the Manhattan School of Music, composition with Andrew Thomas and Milton Babbitt at the Juilliard School and with Charles Wuorinen at the Rutgers University. Rovner earned a Ph.D. He also was a student of Eric Ewazen in Estherwood, New York and of Joseph Dubiel at Columbia University. From 1989 to 1990 he was a fellowship student at the Moscow Conservatory (studies with Nikolai Sidelnikov). Since 1992 he is artistic director of the Bridge Contemporary Music Series at the Lincoln Center for the Performing Arts in New York and a member of the American Music Center. 2005 he was composer-in-residence at the Visby International Centre for Composers, Sweden. He interviewed composers like Jean-Luc Darbellay, Alvin Lucier and Tristan Murail. His music has been presented in Europe, Asia and America.
