= Xochicuicatl cuecuechtli =

An Ahuani woman dancing in the Xochicuicatl Cuecuechtli opera

Xochicuicatl cuecuechtli (Ribald Flowersong) is the first contemporary opera exclusively developed in Nahuatl language and accompanied by an orchestra of Native Mexican instruments. It was written between June, 2011 and January, 2013 by Mexican composer Gabriel Pareyon, after more than a decade of literary, musical and linguistic research. Its text and poetical contents directly come from the homonymous poem, compiled by friar Bernardino de Sahagun amidst the 16th century, among Nahua informants that survived the Conquest of the Aztec Empire. This original text is comprised within the collection of Aztec songs known under the title of Cantares Mexicanos or Mexicacuicatl.

Premiered in August, 2014, in Arcelia, Guerrero, under the guidance of music and stage director Jose Navarro-Noriega, the piece's plot originates from a reinterpretation proposed by historian and linguist Patrick Johansson, on the erotic sense of the concept cuecuechcuicatl (playful ribald) and the expressive whole that it embodies: song, poetry, music and dance, where sexuality is rather a source for philosophical-existential depth.

== Innovation ==
The piece offers a carefully analyzed vision of the Nahua universe without pursuing an archaeological reconstruction or attempting a folklore piece. It proposes a distinct operatic structure that brings new ways to relate the arts, scenically and methodologically, different to the European tradition.

The orchestra is formed exclusively by ancestral original Mexican instruments (mainly percussions such as huehuetl and teponaztli, but also a wide gamut of Native Mexican aerophones), for which a score with an original notation distinct from the pentagram signature style, has been created based on symbols of the ancient iconography of Mexico.

Xochicuicatl cuecuechtli proposes a treatment of the voice, based in the articulation and dramatization of each word in Nahuatl, totally different to Western traditional vocalization. The expressiveness involved does not allow any artistic discipline to overtake another, allowing poetry, dance and music to compose a symbolic whole.

== Plot and structure ==
The symbolic complexity of this cuecuechcuicatl (operatic genre of the Mexican erotic-philosophical tradition), evidences the existentialist conception of sexuality in the Aztec universe as a "return" to death. The initial sound of a conch (Lobatus gigas) refers to the myth of human gestation in the underworld, where the breath of Quetzalcoatl penetrates the conch (a female symbol) and the product of sound enters in its turn on heard of the divinity of death (Mictlantecuhtli), fertilizing it. Then the demiurge Quetzalcoatl adopts the shape of a Cuicamatini (Master Singer, a bearer of wisdom), who teaches music (cuicatl) to three young women (the Ahwahnees) which in turn learn the art of preparing food from maize.

The world of the ahuaianis is disturbed by the arrival of a stranger: the Tohuenyo, a Huastec, agile and attractive young man that seduces the three luscious girls. After a lustful play, with a climatic dance (mitotl), finally the ahuaianis leave the Tohuenyo, who discovers his destiny as loneliness and darkness. The plot changes when the patron of blossoms, colour, poetry and music, Xochipilli, suddenly appears in an epiphany, bringing a present for the Tohuenyo: an ocarina (a huilacapiztli, symbol of sex and death), referring to the ephemeral nature of the sexual act and the human existence. In short, the work refers to the sexual act as an analogy of life, intense and brief, spirited and fleeting.

The show consists of 28 scenic frames, with 6 characters performed by 5 performers (dancers that follow their own score, in addition to lyrics and special vocalization also performed by them), and 20 musicians on stage playing during an hour.

== Awards ==
Xochicuicatl cuecuechtli received a Special Mention at the Music Theatre NOW festival as a 2015 Winning Selection by the International Theatre Institute in cooperation with the German Centre of ITI.
