= Ana Lara =

Mexican composer (born 1959)

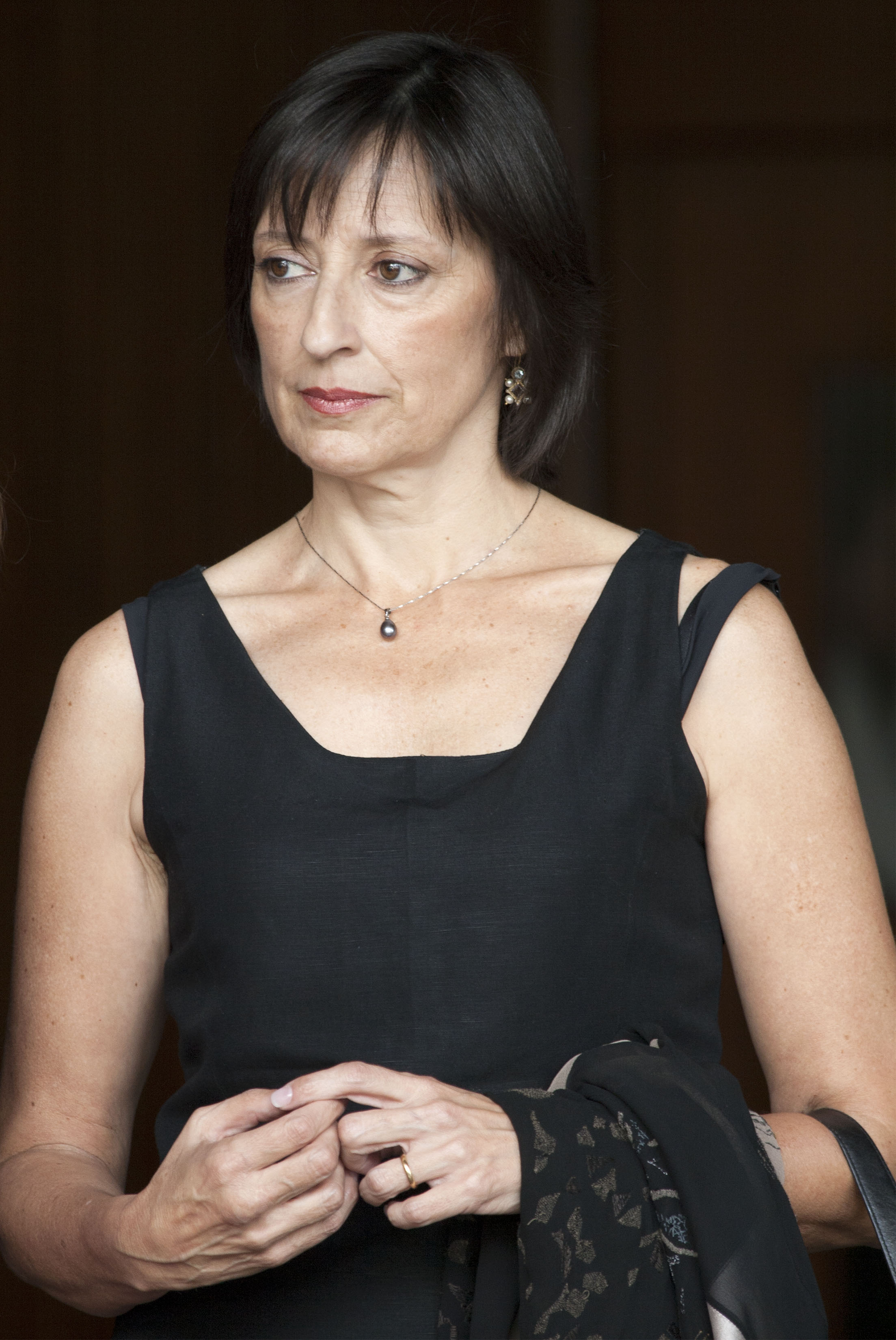
Ana Lara during the premiere of her work Altre Lontananze

Ana Lara (born 30 November 1959) is a Mexican composer.

== Life ==
Ana Lara was born in Mexico City and studied at the National Conservatory of Music with Mario Lavista and Daniel Catán and later with Federico Ibarra. She continued her studies at the Warsaw Academy of Music with Zbigniew Rudzinski and Włodzimierz Kotoński. She also studied ethnomusicology at the University of Maryland, graduating with a Master of Arts degree.

After completing her studies, Lara worked as a composer and music producer. In 1989 she began producing a Mexico City University Radio (Radio UNAM) contemporary music program, and in 2000 she was nominated as Best Classical Album Producer at the Latin Grammy Awards. She founded and served as artistic director of Mexico's International Festival Música y Escena, and served as artistic director of the Puebla Instrumenta Verano 2004 summer courses. She also teaches music and seminars on Latin American and twentieth century music.

In 2022, she received the Fine Arts Medal given by the Mexican Government to artist with an international career.

== Works ==
Selected works include:

- 1996 Y la marcha de la humanidad? for stage. Choreography by Alicia Sánchez
- 1998 Más allá for stage
- 1999 Viejas Historias for stage. Choreography by Rossana Filomarino
- 2000 Celebraciones for stage. Choreography by Rossana Filomarino
- 2002 Elles for stage. Choreography by Luoise Bédard
- 1997 Requiem, for choir a cappella
- 1986 Two etudes, piano
- 1990 Saga, harp
- 1992 Pegaso, harpsichord, piano or organ
- 2006 Recuerdos del poeta, piano
- 2007 Cake walk (Caminata de pastelito)
- 1985 In Memoriam, cello and G flute
- 1992 Vitrales, viola, cello and doublebass
- 1992 O mar, maré, bateaux, guitar four hands or two guitars
- 1998–1999 Darkness Visible, flute, clarinet/Bs clarinet, violin, viola, cello, base, piano and percussion
- 2000 Estudios Rítmicos, for percussion quartet
- 2001 Vértigos, trio for c and alto flutes, clarinet and bass clarinet and piano
- 2005 Epitafios y otras muertes for baritone and piano
- 2005 Serenata for wind quintet and string quintet
- 2006–2007 Sagitario, Capricornio, Acuario for large ensemble
- 2007 Dylan y las ballenas, 8 cellos and narrator
- 1989 La Víspera for orchestra
- 1990–1991 Desasosiego, mezzo/actress and chamber orchestra
- 1993–1994 Angeles de llama y hielo, for orchestra
- 2003–2004 Dos visiones, for orchestra
- 2006 Concerto for bassett horn
- 2007 Cuatro habitantes, for percussion quartet and orchestra
- 2008–2009 Altre Lontananze, concerto for organ and orchestra
- 2018 Of Bronze and Blaze for wind ensemble
