= Ahuiateteo =

Group of five Aztec gods

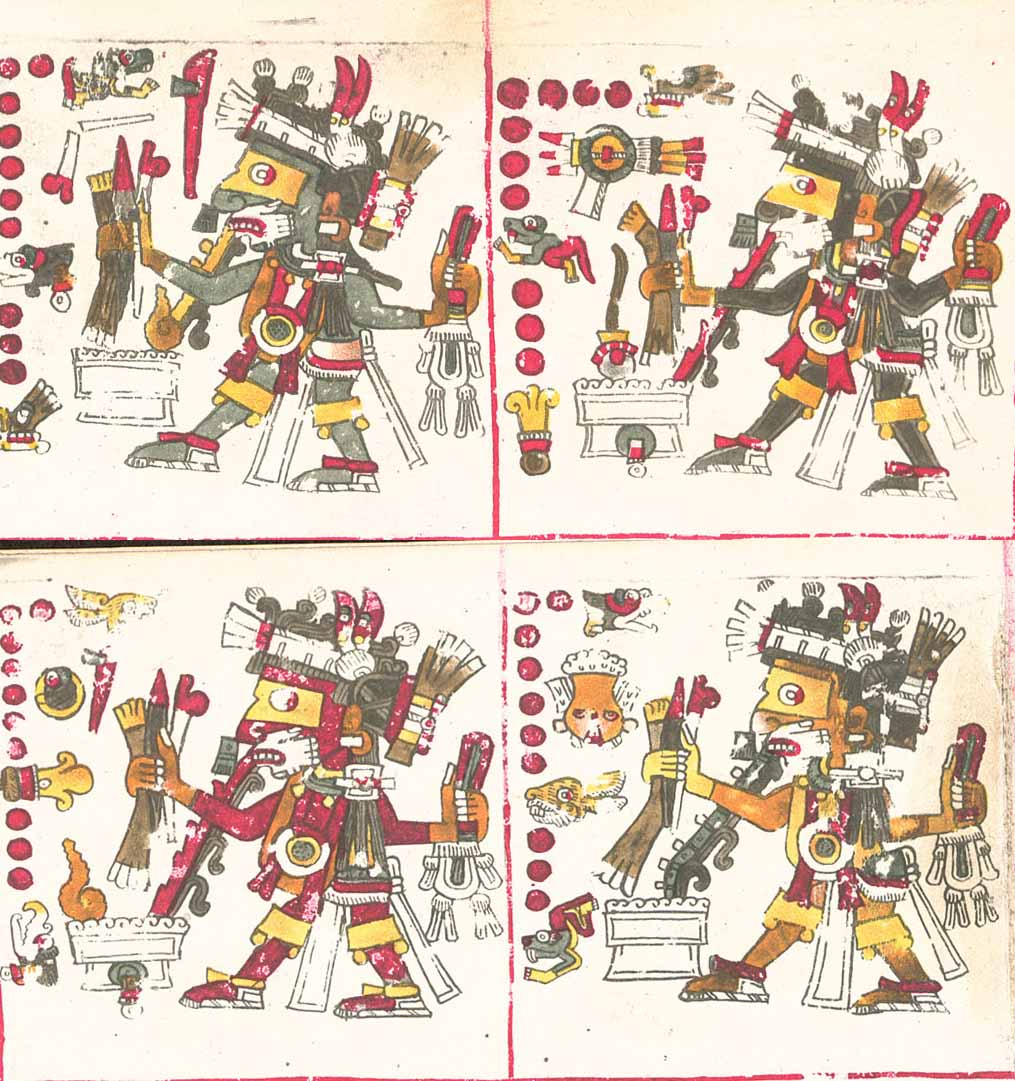
Macuiltonaleque, Codex Borgia.

Āhuiatēteoh (Nahuatl pronunciation: [aːwijateːˈteoʔ]) or Mācuīltōnalequeh (Nahuatl pronunciation: [maːkʷiːɬtoːnaˈlekee̥]) were a group of five Aztec gods of excess and pleasure. They also represented the dangers that come along with these. These five gods were also invoked by diviners and mystics. They were associated with the Tzitzimimeh, a group of frightening beings that personified death, drought, and war.

The five gods are:

- Mācuīlcōzcacuāuhtli (Nahuatl pronunciation: [maːkʷiːɬkoːsˈkaːʍt͡ɬi]; Five Vulture), the god of gluttony
- Mācuīlcuetzpalin (Nahuatl pronunciation: [maːkʷiːɬkʷet͡sˈpalin̥]; Five Lizard)
- Mācuīlmalīnalli (Nahuatl pronunciation: [maːkʷiːɬmaliːˈnalːi]; Five Grass)
- Mācuīltōchtli (Nahuatl pronunciation: [maːkʷiːɬˈtoːt͡ʃt͡ɬi]; Five Rabbit), the god of drunkenness
- Mācuīlxōchitl (Nahuatl pronunciation: [maːkʷiːɬˈʃoːt͡ʃit͡ɬ]; Five Flower), the patron god of palace folk as well as gambling and music; also an aspect of Xōchipilli

== Bibliography ==
- Miller, Mary; Karl Taube (2003, 1993). An Illustrated Dictionary of the Gods and Symbols of Ancient Mexico and the Maya. London: Thames & Hudson. ISBN 0-500-27928-4. OCLC 28801551
- Pohl, John M. D. (Spring 1998). Themes of Drunkenness, Violence, and Factionalism in Tlaxcalan Altar Paintings. RES: Anthropology and Aesthetics No. 33, Pre-Columbian States of Being, pp. 184–207. The President and Fellows of Harvard College acting through the Peabody Museum of Archaeology and Ethnology JSTOR 20167008 (subscription required)
