= Gestalt qualities =

Gestalt qualities (German: Gestaltqualitäten) are concepts found in gestalt psychology which refer to the essential nature of a perceptual experience. An example would be how a melody is perceived, as a whole, rather than merely the sum of its individual notes. A formed Gestalt is an entire, complete structure, with clearly defined contours. The quality “trans – positivity” is manifested in the fact that the image of the whole remains even if all the parts change. Gestalt qualities were introduced by the Austrian philosopher Christian von Ehrenfels in his essay "On Gestalt Qualities," published in 1890. "Ehrenfels qualities" may be another term for the same phenomena. The qualities were based on tests done by flashing lights for certain amounts of time. This discovery later led to the famous Gestalt effect discovered by Max Wertheimer.

== Founding of Gestalt theory ==
The origins of Gestalt psychology are incompletely known. In the 1880s, psychologists in Europe were greatly disturbed by von Ehrenfels' claim that thousands of percepts have characteristics which cannot be derived from the characteristics of their ultimate components, the so-called sensations. Chords and melodies in hearing, the shape characteristics of visual objects, the roughness or the smoothness of tactual impressions, and so forth were used as examples. All these "Gestalt qualities" have one thing in common. When the physical stimuli in question are considerably changed, while their relations are kept constant, the Gestalt qualities remain about the same. But, At the time, it was generally assumed that the sensations involved are individually determined by their individual stimuli and must therefore change when these are greatly changed. Both positive and negative aesthetic characteristics of the world around us, not only of ornaments, paintings, sculptures, tunes, and so forth, but also of trees, landscapes, houses, cars—and other persons—belong to this class. That relations between the sexes largely depend on specimens of the same class need hardly be emphasized. It is, therefore, not safe to deal with problems of psychology as though there were no such qualities. And yet, beginning with Ehrenfels himself, psychologists have not been able to explain their nature.

In the analysis of Gestalts, the whole is primary. The parts are understood within the systematic whole. A paradigmatic example of "Gestalt qualities" is a melody, which sounds the same in any key. In 1890, Christian von Ehrenfels attributed these qualities to melodies as "a positive quality of presentation," not something projected upon sense data. Ehrenfels extended these qualities to "Gestalt qualities of a higher order," (such as marriage, service, theft, and war) concepts that retain their identity even though the examples that instantiate them change. For philosophers and psychologists of the 1890s, it was not clear whether these qualities of structure were philosophical or psychological. The Gestalt theorists would attempt to integrate both in an experimental science. Jonathan Crary describes Ehrenfels' assertions within the modern problem of form as the attempt to formulate "laws" that would give to perception a semblance of the same unconditional guarantees that vision had had within the classical regime of visuality.

The starting point of the theory of Gestalt qualities was the attempt to answer the question: what is a melody? The evident answer is the sum of the individual tones which make up the melody. The fact that the same melody may be made up of different groups of tones opposes this theory. Ernst Mach, who was struck by this fact, drew from it the conclusion that the essence of melody must reside in a sum of special sensation which accompany the tones as aural sensations. Mach did not know how to specify these special sensations. The pivotal step in founding the theory of Gestalt qualities was the declaration that if memory images of successive tones are present as a simultaneous consciousness-complex, then a presentation of new category can arise in consciousness. This would in turn be a unitary presentation, which is uncharacteristically associated with the presentations of the related complex of tones.

== Principles of Gestalt ==
All of the above properties of perception – the constant figure, the background – in gestalt is in a relationship with each other and represents a new property. This is the gestalt form quality. The integrity of the perception and its order are achieved through the following principles of Gestalt psychology:

- Closeness. Nearby incentives tend to be seen together.
- Similarity. Incentives that are similar in size, shape, color or form tend to be seen together.
- Integrity. Perception tends to simplicity and integrity.
- Insularity. Reflects the tendency to complete a figure so that it takes a full form.
- Contiguity. The incentives’ closeness in space and time. Contiguity can predetermine the perception when one event causes another.
- Common area. Principles of gestalt form our everyday perception, along with learning and past experiences. Anticipating the thoughts and expectations and actively manage our interpretation of sensations.

By pointing out that Gestalt qualities are subject to abstraction Ehrenfels provided, at the same time and apparently without realizing it, the "counterweight to the individualistic tendencies" of which he speaks in the last paragraph of his paper. More recently, Gestalt theory has indeed been claimed as an ally for the idiographic view, according to which the uniqueness of the individual whole excludes any kind of lawful generalization. Ehrenfels touches the most sensitive spot of Gestalt theory when he discusses a question likely to be raised in response to his approach. There is to be assumed an infinitely large number of mutual influences among the parts or combinations of parts. His most striking counterargument is if we look at the facts, we find that each part is clearly given to us as to its own nature and function in the whole.

== Gestalt qualities in poetry ==
After an empirical investigation of the perceived effects of poetry the relationship between rhyme pattern and Gestalt qualities was investigated by manipulating the rhyme scheme of a four-line stanza. It was assumed that the perceived effects of poetry are a function of the degree of perceptual organization that can be found in the poetic text. Furthermore, to be receptive to such effects demands an experiential set on the part of the reader, which may be predicted from the reader's rating on the Absorption Scale. The results indicate that high-absorption and low-absorption readers differ in their perception and evaluation of the texts. In particular, what the low-absorption readers judge to be good closure, the high-absorption readers judge to be ‘open’.
