= Acephalous society =

Society which lacks political leaders or hierarchies

In anthropology, an acephalous society (from the Greek ἀκέφαλος "headless") is a society which lacks political leaders or hierarchies. Such groups are also known as non-stratified societies. Typically these societies are small-scale, organized into bands or tribes that make decisions through consensus decision making rather than appointing permanent chiefs or kings.

When societies do not possess distinctions of rank, they are described as egalitarian.

In scientific literature covering native African societies and the effect of European colonialism on them the term is often used to describe groups of people living in a settlement with "no government in the sense of a group able to exercise effective control over both the people and their territory". In this respect the term is also often used as synonymous to "stateless society". Such societies are described as consensus-democratic in opposition to the majority-democratic systems of the West.

The Tiv and Igbo of Nigeria, the Nuer of Sudan, the Somalis, and the Bedouin Arabs throughout North Africa are allegedly acephalous or egalitarian societies.

== See also ==
- Social stratification
- Class stratification
- Consensus decision-making
- Anarchism
