= Julio Estrada (composer) =

Mexican musician

Julio Estrada Velasco (born 10 April 1943) is a composer, theoretician, historian, pedagogue, and interpreter.

== Life ==
Estrada was born in Mexico City, where his family had been exiled from Spain since 1941. He began his musical studies in Mexico from 1953–65, where he studied composition with Julián Orbón. In Paris from 1965-69 he studied with Nadia Boulanger, Olivier Messiaen and attended courses and lectures of Iannis Xenakis. In Germany he studied with Karlheinz Stockhausen in 1968 and with György Ligeti in 1972. He completed a Ph.D. in musicology at Strasbourg University from 1990–1994.

Since 1974 he became researcher in music at the UNAM Instituto de Investigaciones Estéticas, where he was appointed as the Chair of a project on Mexican Music History and as the head of "Música, Sistema Interactivo de Investigación y Composición", a musical system designed by himself. He is the first music scholar to be honored as member of the Science Academy of Mexico, and by the Mexican Education Ministry as National Researcher since 1984, and since 1985 at the top level (III). He created the Laboratorio de Creación Musical at UNAM, where he has been teaching theory and philosophy of musical creation.

He has written more than a hundred articles based on his research. Some have been translated into English, French, German, Italian, Japanese and Norwegian. He is the General Editor of La Música de México He wrote with Jorge Gil (IIE UNAM, Mexico 1984). He has postulated a General Theory of Intervallic Classes, applicable to macro and microintervallic scales of duration and of pitch. He led the development of the computer music program MUSIIC, which was designed and written by Max Díaz, with the assistance of Víctor Adán at a later version, to generate the combinatorial potential of music scales based on the division of the octave.

In the field of the continuum Estrada has developed new methods of multidimensional graphic representation of different components of sound (pitch, dynamics, colour), rhythm (pulse, attack, vibrato) and three-dimensional physical space. His first research on the continuum field was published in 1998 in Darmstadt : Ouvrir l'horizon du son: le continuum.

He has been a visiting professor at Stanford, California, San Diego, New Mexico, Musikwissenschaft Institut, Rostock, Sorbonne and Darmstadt.

== Work ==
=== Music ===
His music is associated to compositional research on diverse domaines:

scales:

- Suite, piano 1960

improvisational processes:

- Persona, vocal trio 1969

compositional mechanos:

- Memorias for a Keyboard 1971

finite Group Algebra and networks theory:

- Melódica, 1973
- Canto mnémico 1973-83

intervallic identities:

- Canto tejido, piano 1974
- Canto alterno, cello 1978
- Canto oculto, violin 1977

discontinuum and continuum macro-timbre and sound spacialization:

- Canto naciente, brass octet 1975-78
- eolo'oolin, six percussionists 1981-90

continuum and multiparametric polyphony:

- eua'on, electronic (UPIC) 1980
- eua'on'ome, orchestra 1995
- yuunohui'se, 'ome, 'yei, nahui, for the strings 1983-90
- yuunohui'wah, noisemaker 2008
- yuunohui'ehecatl, winds 2012

continuum topological variation:

- ishini’ioni, string quartet 1984-90

continuum-discontinuum modulation:

- yuunohui’tlapoa, keyboard 1997

new conception of the opera:

- Murmullos del páramo, voices, instruments and electronic spatialization 1992-2006

=== Scores ===
His works are mainly published by Juliusedimus and Editions Salabert, France.

=== Books ===
Musica Y Teoria De Grupos Finitos: 3 Variables Booleanas, with an English resumé, Estrada, Julio, Jorge Gil. UNAM, 1st edition (1984). (Format: Book (Illustrated), 221 pages, ISBN 968-837-005-3,ISBN 978-968-837-005-6)

La música de México, Julio Estrada editor, 10 vols, History, Bibliographical guide and Music Anthology, UNAM 1984-88

El sonido en Rulfo: el ruido ese, with a CD containing sound examples and "Doloritas", first part of the opera Murmullos del páramo, UNAM, 1st edition 1989, 2nd edition 2006

Canto roto: Silvestre Revueltas, UNAM-FCE 2012

=== Software ===
eua'oolin Music system conceived by Estrada was developed by Mario Peña to generate tridimensional trajectories representing 3 different components of sound (pitch, dynamics, colour) to be converted into a musical score with pitch resolutions of 1/3, 1/4, 1/5, 1/6, 1/8 of tone, UNAM 1990-1995.

UPIC-Win Windows version of the UPIC by Xenakis developed by Marino, Fontaliirant and Estrada at the CEMAMu, France, 2000-2001.

Músiic-Win

- d1 Theory, Teoría d1. This program, conceived by Estrada and based on his d1 Theory, was designed and developed by Max Díaz and Víctor Adán.

== Statement ==
The techniques and theories I have developed are based on mathematics and acoustics; the more neutral they remain, the better they serve the description of the imaginary: it is my ear---there everything is allowed---that gives birth to my music, which becomes the accurate, almost phonographic representation of every detail coming from my inner hearing experiences.

== Awards ==
- Premio Universidad Nacional (2000)
- Ordre des Arts et des Lettres awarded by the French Ministry of Culture, (1981, 1986)
