= 1953 in music =

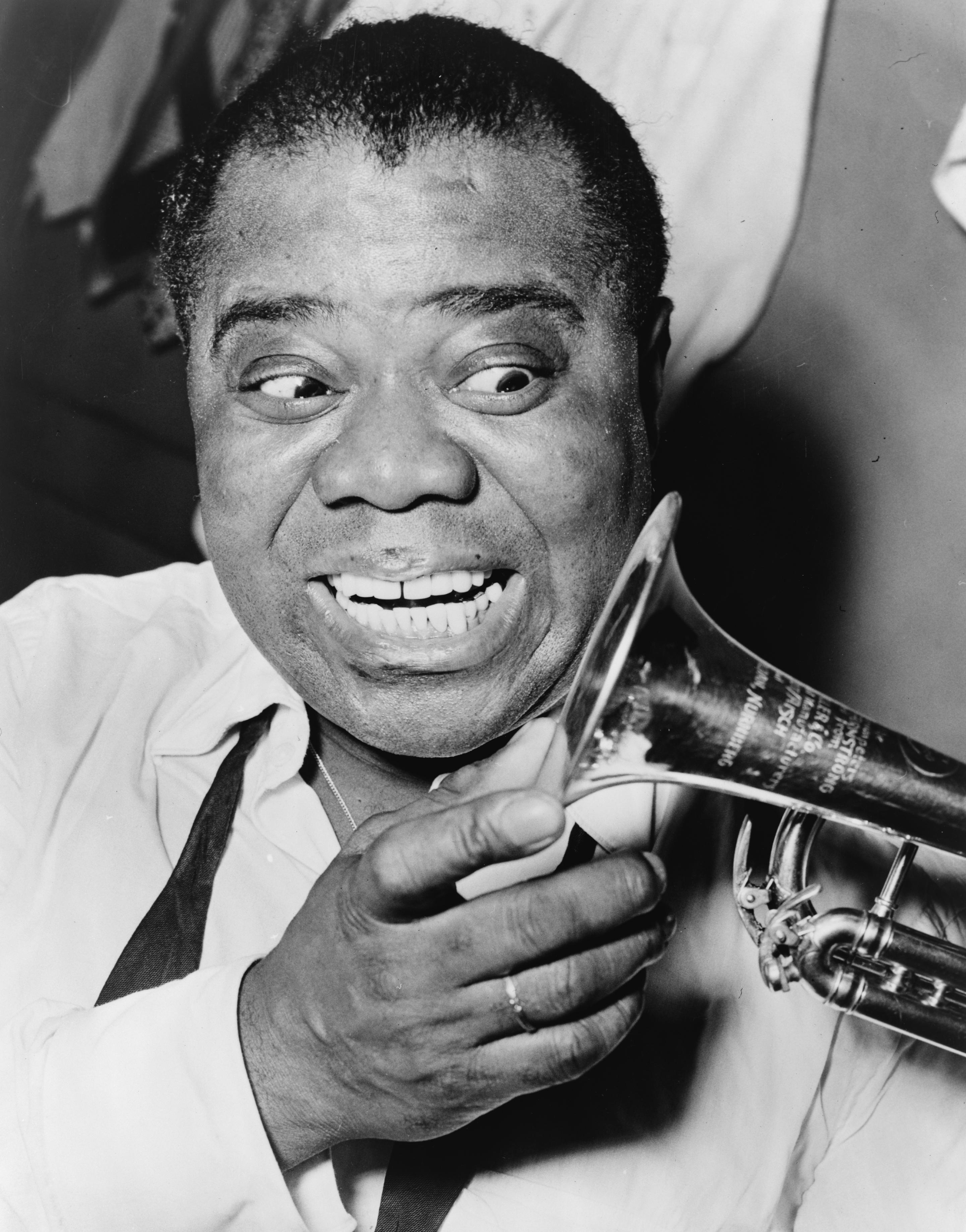
Jazz trumpeter and bandleader Louis Armstrong in 1953.

This is a list of notable events in music that took place in the year 1953.

== Specific locations ==
- 1953 in British music
- 1953 in Norwegian music

== Specific genres ==
- 1953 in country music
- 1953 in jazz

== Events ==
- February 6 – Contralto Kathleen Ferrier, already terminally ill with cancer, leaves Covent Garden Opera House in London on a stretcher after being taken ill on the second night of her run in Gluck's Orfeo ed Euridice.
- March 12 – Heinrich Sutermeister's opera Romeo und Julia receives its English première at Sadler's Wells Theatre in London, conducted by James Robertson.
- April – Pat Boone begins his recording career at Republic Records.
- May 26 – Werner Meyer-Eppler, Fritz Enkel, Herbert Eimert and Robert Beyer open a pioneering electronic music studio at the Cologne studios of the NWDR.
- May 30 - Shirley Booth, Dino Di Luca and John Serry Sr. collaborate for the last time in the final performance of The Time of the Cuckoo at the closing of the Empire Theatre in New York City.
- July 16–29 – The Internationale Ferienkurse für Neue Musik are held at Darmstadt.
- July 18 – Elvis Presley's Sun recordings: Elvis Presley makes his first recordings (a copy of which is owned by Jack White when he wins an auction on eBay in January 2015).
- September 27 – Helen Traubel ends her long association with the Metropolitan Opera in New York City after having appeared in Chicago as a night-club singer.
- October – Sir Arthur Bliss replaces Sir Arnold Bax as Master of the Queen's Music in the United Kingdom.
- October 5 – Wilhelm Furtwängler and the soloists in the Vienna State Opera's production of Don Giovanni publicly protest against the suspension of Egon Hilbert as administrator of the Burg Theater and State Opera.
- October 19 – Opening of the Covent Garden opera season in London, with a production of Wagner's Die Walküre.
- October 30 – Ernst Marboe is announced as the new administrator of the Vienna State Opera and Burg Theater, replacing Egon Hilbert.
- November 2 – the Metropolitan Opera announces that a new two-year contract has been agreed with the musicians' union, averting a threatened strike by the orchestra.
- November 17 – Carl Ebert is announced as the new Intendant of the Städtische Oper, (West) Berlin.
- December 7 – the La Scala opera season opens with a production of Alfredo Catalani's La Wally, to mark the hundredth anniversary of the composer's birth.
- Alfred Schnittke becomes a student of Evgeny Golubev.
- Frank Sinatra begins recording at Capitol.
- "Crazy Man, Crazy", recorded by Bill Haley & His Comets, becomes the first rock and roll single to make the Billboard national American musical charts.
- American singer Frankie Laine sets the all-time United Kingdom record for weeks at Number One in a given year on the UK Singles Chart, when his hit singles "Answer Me," "Hey Joe!" and "I Believe" hold the top slot for 27 weeks: a little over half a year. "I Believe", Number One for 18 weeks, also holds the all-time record for a single. Over 50 years later, both records will still hold.
- Eddie Fisher becomes "The Coca-Cola Kid" on the television show Coke Time at a salary of one million dollars a year.
- The Allegri Quartet is formed in the United Kingdom.
- The Platters form in Los Angeles.
- The Erato Records label is founded to promote French classical music.

== Albums released ==
- Anita O'Day Collates – Anita O'Day
- The Astaire Story – Fred Astaire
- Broadway's Best – Jo Stafford
- By the Light of the Silvery Moon – Doris Day
- Calamity Jane – Doris Day
- Country Girl – Bing Crosby
- Dean Martin Sings – Dean Martin
- Dinah Shore Sings the Blues – Dinah Shore
- Georgia Gibbs Sings Oldies – Georgia Gibbs
- Jazz at Massey Hall – The Quintet
- Kay Starr Style – Kay Starr
- Let There Be Love – Joni James
- May I Sing To You – Eddie Fisher
- New Concepts of Artistry in Rhythm – Stan Kenton
- Portrait Of New Orleans – Jo Stafford and Frankie Laine
- Requested By You – Frank Sinatra
- Sinatra Sings His Greatest Hits – Frank Sinatra
- Songs by Tom Lehrer – Tom Lehrer
- Songs of Open Spaces – Guy Mitchell
- Starring Jo Stafford – Jo Stafford

== Biggest hit singles ==
The following singles achieved the highest chart positions in the limited set of charts available for 1953.

#	Artist	Title	Year	Country	Chart entries
1	Dean Martin	That's Amore	1953	(United States)	US BB 1 of 1953, POP 1 of 1953, UK 2 – Jan 1954, US 1940s 2 – Nov 1953, RYM 2 of 1953, Scrobulate 47 of Italian, DDD 73 of 1953, Party 101 of 2007
2	Les Paul & Mary Ford	Vaya Con Dios (May God Be With You)	1953	(United States)	US 1940s 1 – Jun 1953, US 1 for 11 weeks Aug 1953, Italy 2 of 1954, US BB 3 of 1953, POP 3 of 1953, UK 7 – Nov 1953, RYM 24 of 1953, Europe 97 of the 1950s
3	Perry Como	Don't Let the Stars Get in Your Eyes	1953	(United States)	UK 1 – Jan 1953, US 1940s 1 – Dec 1952, US 1 for 5 weeks Jan 1953, US BB 20 of 1953, POP 20 of 1953, RYM 31 of 1953
4	Eddie Fisher	I'm Walking Behind You	1953	(United States)	UK 1 – May 1953, US 1940s 1 – May 1953, US 1 for 2 weeks Jul 1953, US BB 16 of 1953, POP 23 of 1953, RYM 119 of 1953
5	Hank Williams	Your Cheatin' Heart	1953	(United States)	RYM 1 of 1953, DDD 2 of 1953, US BB 4 of 1953, POP 4 of 1953, RIAA 34, Scrobulate 87 of country, Rolling Stone 213, Acclaimed 286

== US No. 1 hit singles ==
These singles reached the top of US Billboard magazine's charts in 1953.

First week	Number of weeks	Title	Artist
January 10, 1953	5	"Don't Let The Stars Get In Your Eyes"	Perry Como
February 14, 1953	5	"Till I Waltz Again With You"	Teresa Brewer
March 21, 1953	8	"The Doggie in the Window"	Patti Page
May 16, 1953	10	"The Song from Moulin Rouge"	Percy Faith & his Orchestra
July 25, 1953	2	"I'm Walking Behind You"	Eddie Fisher
August 8, 1953	9	"Vaya con Dios"	Les Paul & Mary Ford
October 10, 1953	4	"St. George and the Dragonet"	Stan Freberg
November 7, 1953	2	"Vaya con Dios"	Les Paul & Mary Ford
November 21, 1953	6	"Rags to Riches"	Tony Bennett

== Top hits on record ==
- "Allez-Vous-En" – Kay Starr
- "Answer Me, O Lord" – Frankie Laine
- "Anywhere I Wander" – Julius La Rosa
- "April in Portugal", recorded by
  - Les Baxter Orchestra
  - Richard Hayman Orchestra
  - Freddy Martin Orchestra
  - Vic Damone
- "Bye Bye Blues" – Les Paul and Mary Ford
- "Candy Lips" - Doris Day and Johnnie Ray
- "Changing Partners" – Patti Page
- "Choo Choo Train (Ch-Ch-Foo)" - Doris Day
- "The Doggie in the Window" – Patti Page
- "Don't Let The Stars Get In Your Eyes" – Perry Como
- "Dragnet" – Ray Anthony
- "Eh Cumpari" – Julius LaRosa
- "Floatin' Down To Cotton Town" – Frankie Laine & Jo Stafford
- "The Gang That Sang Heart Of My Heart" – The Four Aces featuring Al Alberts
- "Going to the River" - Fats Domino
- "Granada" – Frankie Laine
- "Half a Photograph" – Kay Starr
- "Have You Heard?" – Joni James
- "Hey Joe" – Frankie Laine
- "Hi-Lili, Hi-Lo" – Leslie Caron & Mel Ferrer
- "Hound Dog" – Big Mama Thornton
- "I Believe" – Frankie Laine
- "I'm Walking Behind You" – Eddie Fisher
- "Istanbul (Not Constantinople)" – The Four Lads
- "The Kid's Last Fight" – Frankie Laine
- "Let's Walk That-a-Way" - Doris Day and Johnnie Ray
- "Look At That Girl" – Guy Mitchell
- "Make Love to Me" – Jo Stafford
- "Mister Tap Toe" - Doris Day
- "No Other Love" – Perry Como
- "Oh!" – Pee Wee Hunt and His Orchestra
- "Oh! My Pa-Pa" – Eddie Fisher
- "Outside of Heaven" – Eddie Fisher
- "Pretend" – Nat King Cole
- "Rags to Riches" – Tony Bennett
- "Ricochet" – Teresa Brewer
- "Say You're Mine Again" – Perry Como
- "Secret Love" – Doris Day
- "Seven Lonely Days" – Georgia Gibbs
- "Side by Side" – Kay Starr
- "The Song from Moulin Rouge" – Percy Faith (Felicia Sanders vocal)
- "Stranger in Paradise" – Tony Bennett
- "Tell Me a Story" – Jimmy Boyd and Frankie Laine
- "Tell Me You're Mine" – The Gaylords
- "That's Amore" – Dean Martin
- "Three Coins in the Fountain" – Frank Sinatra
- "The Typewriter" – Leroy Anderson & His Orchestra
- "Vaya con Dios" – Les Paul and Mary Ford
- "Wishing Ring" – Joni James
- "With These Hands" – Eddie Fisher
- "Young at Heart" – Frank Sinatra
- "Your Cheatin' Heart", recorded by
  - Frankie Laine
  - Joni James

== Top R&B and country hits on record ==
- "The Clock" – Johnny Ace with the Beale Streeters
- "Hound Dog" – Big Mama Thornton
- "I Forgot More Than You'll Ever Know"- The Davis Sisters
- "(Mama) He Treats Your Daughter Mean"- Ruth Brown
- "Mess Around" – Ray Charles
- "Please Don't Leave Me" – Fats Domino
- "Your Cheatin' Heart" – Hank Williams

== Published popular music ==
- "And This Is My Beloved" w. & m. adapted Robert Wright & George Forrest
- "Angel Eyes" w. Earl Brent m. Matt Dennis
- "Answer Me, My Love" w. (Eng) Carl Sigman (Ger) & m. Gerhard Winkler & Fred Ravich
- "Baubles, Bangles And Beads" w. & m. adapt Robert Wright & George Forrest. Introduced by Doretta Morrow in the musical Kismet
- "Bell Bottom Blues" w. Hal David m. Leon Carr
- "Bimbo" w.m. Rodney Morris
- "Black Hills Of Dakota" w. Paul Francis Webster m. Sammy Fain. Introduced by Doris Day in the film Calamity Jane.
- "The Boy Friend" w.m. Sandy Wilson.
- "Can-Can" w.m. Cole Porter
- "Caribbean" w.m. Mitchell Torok
- "C'est Magnifique" w.m. Cole Porter. Introduced by Lilo and Peter Cookson in the musical Can-Can
- "Changing Partners" w. Joe Darion m. Larry Coleman
- "Chicka Boom" w.m. Bob Merrill
- "Crying In the Chapel" w.m. Artie Glenn
- "Cry Me a River" w.m. Arthur Hamilton
- "Ebb Tide" w. Carl Sigman m. Robert Maxwell
- "Eh, Cumpari!" trad Ital w. m. adapt. Julius LaRosa & Archie Bleyer
- "Fate" w. & m. adapt Robert Wright & George Forrest from music by Alexander Borodin Adapted from Symphony No. 2 in B Minor. It was introduced by Alfred Drake and Doretta Morrow in the musical Kismet.
- "Gambler's Guitar" w.m. Jim Lowe
- "Gee!" w.m. Viola Watkins, Daniel Norton & William Davis
- "Giddy-Up-A Ding Dong" w.m. Freddie Bell, Pep Lattanzi
- "Goodnite, Sweetheart, Goodnite" James Hudson, Calvin Carter
- "Half a Photograph" w. Bob Russell m. Hal Stanley
- "The Happy Wanderer" w.(Ger) Florenz Siegesmund & Edith Möller (Eng) Antonia Ridge m. Friedrich Wilhelm Möller
- "Here's That Rainy Day" w. Johnny Burke m. Jimmy Van Heusen. Introduced by John Raitt in the musical Carnival In Flanders.
- "Hold My Hand" w.m. Jack Lawrence & Richard Myers
- "I Believe" w.m. Ervin Drake, Jimmy Shirl, Irvin Graham & Al Stillman
- "I Can Do Without You" w. Paul Francis Webster m. Sammy Fain. Introduced by Doris Day and Howard Keel in the film Calamity Jane.
- "(Oh Baby Mine) I Get So Lonely" w.m. Pat Ballard
- "I Love Paris" w.m. Cole Porter. Introduced by Lilo in the musical Can-Can
- "I Really Don't Want To Know" w. Howard Barnes m. Don Robertson
- "I'm Walking Behind You" w.m. Billy Reid
- "Istanbul (Not Constantinople)" w. Jimmy Kennedy m. Nat Simon
- "It's All Right With Me" w.m. Cole Porter
- "It's Love" w. Betty Comden & Adolph Green m. Leonard Bernstein. Introduced by George Gaynes in the musical Wonderful Town. Performed in the 1955 London production by Dennis Bowen.
- "Just Walkin' In The Rain" w.m. Johnny Bragg & Robert S. Riley
- "Little Things Mean a Lot" w.m. Carl Stutz & Edith Lindeman
- "Look at That Girl" w.m. Bob Merrill
- "Make Love to Me" w. Alan Copeland & Bill Norvas Music from "Tin Roof Blues" 1923.
- "The Man That Got Away" w. Ira Gershwin m. Harold Arlen
- "The Man With The Banjo" w. (Eng) Robert Mellin m. Fritz Schulz Reichel
- "Marriage Type Love" w. Oscar Hammerstein II m. Richard Rodgers. Introduced by Arthur Maxwell and Helena Scott in the musical Me And Juliet.
- "Matilda, Matilda!" w.m. Harry Thomas
- "Melancholy Serenade" m. Jackie Gleason
- "Mexican Joe" w.m. Mitchell Torok
- "Money Burns a Hole In My Pocket" w. Bob Hilliard m. Jule Styne. Introduced by Dean Martin in the 1954 film Living It Up.
- "Money Honey" w.m. Jesse Stone
- "My Love, My Love" w. Bob Haymes m. Nick Acquaviva
- "No Other Love" w. Oscar Hammerstein II m. Richard Rodgers. Introduced by Isabel Bigley and Bill Hayes in the musical Me And Juliet.
- "Non Dimenticar" w.(Eng) Shelley Dobbins (Ital) Michele Galdieri m. P. G. Redi
- "Not Since Nineveh" w. & m. adapt Robert Wright & George Forrest From Borodin's "Polovetsian Dances".
- "Oh! My Pa-Pa" w. John Turner & Geoffrey Parsons m. Paul Burkhard
- "The Olive Tree" w. & m. adapt Robert Wright & George Forrest from music by Alexander Borodin
- "Rags to Riches" w.m. Richard Adler & Jerry Ross
- "Ricochet" w.m. Larry Coleman, Joe Darion & Norman Gimbel
- "Rock Around the Clock" w.m. Jimmy De Knight & Max C. Freedman
- "Ronda" w.m. Paulo Vanzolini
- "Santa Baby" w.m. Joan Javits, Phil Springer & Tony Springer
- "Satin Doll" w.m. Billy Strayhorn & Duke Ellington
- "Secret Love" w. Paul Francis Webster m. Sammy Fain. Introduced by Doris Day in the film Calamity Jane
- "Seven Lonely Days" w.m. Alden Shuman, Earl Shuman & Marshal Brown
- "Shake a Hand" w.m. Joe Morris
- "Sippin' Soda" adapt. P. Campbell
- "The Song From "Moulin Rouge"" (a.k.a. "Where Is Your Heart") w. (Eng) William Engvick (Fr) Jacques Larue m. Georges Auric
- "Stranger in Paradise" w. & m. adapt Robert Wright & George Forrest. Introduced by Doretta Morrow and Richard Kiley in the musical Kismet.
- "Such a Night" w.m. Lincoln Chase
- "Sway" ("Quien Será") w. (Eng) Norman Gimbel (Sp) Pablo Beltrán Ruiz m. Pablo Beltran Ruiz
- "Teach Me Tonight" w. Sammy Cahn m. Gene De Paul
- "Tell Me a Story" w.m. Terry Gilkyson
- "That's Amore" w. Jack Brooks m. Harry Warren
- "Vaya con Dios" w.m. Larry Russell, Inez James & Buddy Pepper
- "Wanted" w.m. Jack Fulton & Lois Steele
- "When Love Goes Wrong" w. Harold Adamson m. Hoagy Carmichael from the film Gentlemen Prefer Blondes
- "You Won't Forget Me" w. Kermit Goell m. Fred Spielman Introduced by India Adams dubbing for Joan Crawford in the film Torch Song
- "You, You, You" w.(Eng) Robert Mellin (Ger) Walter Rothenberg m. Lotar Olias
- "Young at Heart" w. Carolyn Leigh m. Johnny Richards

== Classical music ==
=== Premieres ===
Sortable table
Composer	Composition	Date	Location	Performers
Bloch, Ernest	Suite Hébraïque for Viola and Orchestra	1953-01-01	(United States) Chicago	Preves / Chicago Symphony – Kubelik
Boulez, Pierre	Structures book 1, for two pianos	1953-05-04	(West Germany) Cologne	Grimaud, Loriod
Carter, Elliott	String Quartet No. 1	1953-02-26	(United States) New York	Walden Quartet
Chávez, Carlos	Sinfonía romántica (Symphony No. 4)	1953-02-11	(United States) Louisville, KY	Louisville Orchestra – Chávez
Chávez, Carlos	Symphony for Strings (Symphony No. 5)	1953-12-01	(United States) Los Angeles	Los Angeles Chamber Orchestra – Chávez
Goldschmidt, Berthold	String Quartet No. 2	1953-07-14	(United Kingdom) London	London String Quartet
Hartmann, Karl Amadeus	Concerto for piano, winds and percussion	1953-10-10	(West Germany) Donaueschingen (Musiktage)	Bergmann / SWF Symphony – Rosbaud
Holmboe, Vagn	Sinfonia boreale (Symphony No. 8)	1953-03-05	(Denmark) Copenhague	Danish Radio Symphony – Kletzki
Honegger, Arthur	A Christmas Cantata	1953-12-18	(Switzerland) Basel	Basel Chamber Choir – Sacher
Imbrie, Andrew	String Quartet No. 2	1953-12-05	(United States) New York City	Kroll Quartet
Kabalevsky, Dmitri	Piano Concerto No. 3	1953-??-??	(Soviet Union) Moscow	Ashkenazy / Moscow Philharmonic – ?
Martinů, Bohuslav	Rhapsody-Concerto for Viola and Orchestra	1953-02-19	(United States) Cleveland	Veissi / Cleveland Orchestra – Szell
Milhaud, Darius	Symphony No. 5	1953-10-16	(Italy) Turin	RAI National Symphony – Milhaud
Montsalvatge, Xavier	Concierto breve for piano and orchestra	1953-12-20	(Spain) Barcelona	de Larrocha / Barcelona Philharmonic – de Froment
Montsalvatge, Xavier	Poema Concertante for violin and orchestra	1953-05-25	(Spain) Barcelona	Szeryng / Barcelona Municipal Orchestra – Toldrà
Racine Fricker, Peter	Viola Concerto	1953-09-03	(United Kingdom) Edinburgh (Festival)	Primrose / London Philharmonia – Boult
Rubbra, Edmund	Viola Concerto	1953-04-15	(United Kingdom) London	BBC Symphony – Sargent
Shostakovich, Dmitri	String Quartet No. 5	1953-11-13	(Soviet Union) Moscow	Beethoven Quartet
Shostakovich, Dmitri	Symphony No. 10	1953-12-17	(Soviet Union) Leningrad	Leningrad Philharmonic – Mravinsky
Karlheinz Stockhausen	Kontra-Punkte	1953-05-26	(West Germany) Cologne (ISCM World Music Days)	members of the WDR Symphony – Scherchen
Stockhausen, Karlheinz	Schlagquartett	1953-03-23	(West Germany) Munich (Musica Viva)	Porth, Gschwendner, Peinkofer, Kaul
Vaughan Williams, Ralph	Sinfonia antartica (Symphony No. 7)	1953-01-14	(United Kingdom) Manchester	Ritchie / Hallé Orchestra – John Barbirolli
Villa-Lobos, Heitor	Alvorada na Floresta Tropical for orchestra	1953-??-??	(United States) Louisville, KY	Louisville Orchestra – Whitney
Villa-Lobos, Heitor	Piano Concerto No. 4	1953-01-09	(United States) Syria Mosque, Pittsburgh, PA	Segall / Pittsburgh Symphony Orchestra – Villa-Lobos

=== Compositions ===
- Malcolm Arnold
  - Symphony No. 2
- Carlos Chávez
  - Symphony for Strings (Symphony No. 5)
- George Crumb
  - Sonata, for viola and piano
- Ernő Dohnányi
  - American Rhapsody
- Karel Goeyvaerts
  - Nummer 5
- Cristóbal Halffter
  - Piano Concerto
- Ernesto Halffter
  - Fantasia española for cello and piano
- Rodolfo Halffter
  - Hojas de album (3) for piano, Op. 22
- Karl Amadeus Hartmann
  - Concerto for piano, winds and percussion
- Arthur Honegger
  - A Christmas Cantata
- Karel Husa
  - String Quartet No. 2
- Andrew Imbrie
  - String Quartet No. 2
- György Ligeti
  - Sonata for Solo Cello
- Bohuslav Martinů
  - Concerto for violin, piano, and orchestra
  - Overture
  - Fantaisies symphoniques (Symphony No. 6)
- Peter Racine Fricker
  - Viola Concerto
- Giacinto Scelsi
  - Five Incantations for piano
- Dmitri Shostakovich
  - Ballet Suite No. 4
  - Symphony No. 10
- Karlheinz Stockhausen
  - Klavierstücke I–IV (revised version)
  - Kontra-Punkte
  - Studie I
- Eugen Suchoň – Metamorphosis for orchestra
- Ralph Vaughan Williams – The Old Hundredth Psalm Tune
- Heitor Villa-Lobos
  - Alvorada na Floresta Tropical for orchestra
  - Cello Concerto No. 2
  - Fantaisie concertante for piano, clarinet and bassoon
  - Harp Concerto
  - Odisseia de uma raça, symphonic poem
  - String Quartet No. 14
  - Symphony No. 10, Sumé Pater Patrium (Sinfonia ameríndia) (Sumé, Father of Fathers [Amerindian Symphony])

== Opera ==
- The Decembrists (Yuri Shaporin) first staged 23 June 1953 at the Bolshoi Theatre, Moscow.
- The Dumb Wife (Joseph Horovitz), premiered 21 November 1953 at the Guildhall School, London, by the Intimate Opera Company.
- Gloriana (Benjamin Britten) composed 1953, first performed on 8 July 1953 at the Royal Opera House, Covent Garden in the presence of Elizabeth II.
- Irmelin (Frederick Delius) composed 1890–92; first produced Oxford, 4 May 1953.
- Lenora 40/50 (Rolf Liebermann) first produced in Berlin on 12 February 1953 at the State Opera House in the British sector.
- Man of Enterprise (Denis Bloodworth) first produced on 8 December 1953 at Tiffin School, Kingston, Surrey, by the school operatic society.
- Menna (Arwel Hughes) premiered by the Welsh National Opera at the Pavilion in Cardiff on 9 November, with the composer conducting.
- Nelson (Lennox Berkeley), premiered in a concert performance 14 February 1953 by the English Opera Group at Wigmore Hall, London.
- Sevil (Fikrat Amirov)
- Three's Company (Antony Hopkins), premiered 21 November 1953 at the Guildhall School, London, by the Intimate Opera Company.
- The Tinners of Cornwall (Inglis Gundry), premiered 30 September 1953 at Rudolf Steiner Hall, conducted by Geoffrey Corbett.

== Film ==
- Georges Auric - Roman Holiday
- Karl-Birger Blomdahl - Sawdust and Tinsel
- George Duning - From Here to Eternity
- Bronislau Kaper - Lili
- Alfred Newman - The Robe
- Miklós Rózsa - Julius Caesar
- Leith Stevens - War of the Worlds
- Victor Young - Shane

== Musical theater ==
- Airs On A Shoestring London revue opened at the Royal Court Theatre on April 22 and ran for 772 performances
- At The Lyric London production
- The Boy Friend (Sandy Wilson) commenced at London's Players Club on April 14 and reopened in an expanded version on October 13 before moving to the West End proper in 1954.
- Braziliana London production
- The Buccaneer London production
- Can-Can (Cole Porter) – Broadway production opened at the Shubert Theatre on May 7 and ran for 892 performances
- The Glorious Days West End production opens at the Palace Theatre on February 28 and ran for 246 performances
- Hazel Flagg Broadway production opened at the Mark Hellinger Theatre on February 11 and ran for 190 performances
- John Murray Anderson's Almanac Broadway revue opened at the Imperial Theatre on December 10 and ran for 227 performances
- The King And I (Richard Rodgers and Oscar Hammerstein II) London production opened at the Drury Lane Theatre on October 8 and ran for 926 performances
- Kismet Broadway production opened at the Ziegfeld Theatre on December 3 and ran for 583 performances
- Maggie Broadway production opened at the Royal National Theatre on February 18 and ran for 5 performances
- Me And Juliet Broadway production opened at the Majestic Theatre on May 28 and ran for 358 performances
- Paint Your Wagon (Alan Jay Lerner and Frederick Loewe) – London production opened at Her Majesty's Theatre on February 11 and ran for 477 performances
- The Wayward Way
- Wonderful Town (Leonard Bernstein, Betty Comden and Adolph Green) – Broadway production opened at the Winter Garden Theatre on February 25 and ran for 559 performances

== Musical films ==
- The Affairs of Dobie Gillis starring Debbie Reynolds, Bobby Van, Barbara Ruick and Bob Fosse
- The Band Wagon
- By the Light of the Silvery Moon
- Calamity Jane starring Doris Day and Howard Keel
- The Desert Song
- The Farmer Takes a Wife starring Betty Grable, Dale Robertson, John Carroll, Thelma Ritter and Eddie Foy, Jr.
- Gentlemen Prefer Blondes
- I Love Melvin starring Debbie Reynolds and Donald O'Connor
- The Jazz Singer
- Kiss Me Kate starring Howard Keel, Kathryn Grayson, Ann Miller, Keenan Wynn and James Whitmore
- Lili
- Peter Pan animated feature
- Singin' in the Rain starring Gene Kelly, Donald O'Connor and Debbie Reynolds
- Small Town Girl starring Jane Powell, Ann Miller, Farley Granger, S. Z. Sakall, Bobby Van, Billie Burke, Fay Wray and featuring Nat "King" Cole. Directed by László Kardos.
- So This Is Love released July 15 starring Kathryn Grayson as Grace Moore.
- The Stooge released February 4 starring Martin and Lewis.
- Three Sailors and a Girl starring Jane Powell, Gordon MacRae and Gene Nelson
- Torch Song released October 23 starring Joan Crawford and Michael Wilding

== Births ==
- January 6 – Malcolm Young, rock musician (AC/DC) (d. 2017)
- January 10 – Pat Benatar, singer ("Hit Me with Your Best Shot" etc.)
- January 21 – Glenn Kaiser, American singer-songwriter and guitarist (Resurrection Band)
- January 23 – Robin Zander, rock musician (Cheap Trick)
- January 26 – Lucinda Williams, singer
- January 29
  - Louie Perez (Los Lobos)
  - Teresa Teng, singer
  - Charlie Wilson, American R&B singer, songwriter, and record producer
- February 3 – Joëlle, singer (d. 1982)
- February 14 - Carmine Rojas, American bass guitarist, musical director and composer
- February 18 – Robin Bachman, drummer (Bachman–Turner Overdrive and Brave Belt)
- February 20
  - Riccardo Chailly, conductor
  - Kristy Wallace, known as Poison Ivy, American songwriter and guitarist (The Cramps)
- February 26 – Michael Bolton, American singer (Blackjack)
- March 3 – Robyn Hitchcock, singer-songwriter and guitarist
- March 12 – Ryan Paris, singer
- March 19 – Ricky Wilson (The B-52s) (d. 1985)
- March 23 – Chaka Khan, singer
- March 31
  - Sean Hopper (Huey Lewis and the News)
  - Greg Martin (The Kentucky Headhunters)
- April 4 – Chen Yi, Chinese classical composer and violinist
- April 16 – Peter Garrett, activist and lead vocalist (Midnight Oil)
- April 21 – Todd Phillips, American bassist and composer (David Grisman Quintet)
- April 28
  - Pat Donohue, guitarist (The Guys All-Star Shoe Band on A Prairie Home Companion)
  - Kim Gordon, American musician, songwriter and visual artist
- May 4 – Oleta Adams, American soul and jazz singer
- May 8
  - Billy Burnette (Fleetwood Mac)
  - Alex Van Halen (Van Halen)
- May 9
  - Connie Kaldor, Canadian singer-songwriter
  - Kojo, singer
- May 15 – Mike Oldfield, composer & musician
- May 16 – Richard Page (Mr. Mister)
- May 17 – George Johnson (The Brothers Johnson)
- May 29 – Danny Elfman, singer-songwriter and film composer (Oingo Boingo)
- June 6 – June Yamagishi, Japanese-American guitarist (Papa Grows Funk and The Wild Magnolias)
- June 7 – Johnny Clegg, South African mbaqanga and Afro-pop musician and musical anthropologist (d. 2019)
- June 12 – Rocky Burnette, American rock singer
- June 13 – Baaba Maal, Senegalese singer and guitarist
- June 19 – Larry Dunn, American rock keyboardist (Earth Wind & Fire)
- June 20 – Dušan Rapoš, Slovak composer
- June 22 – Cyndi Lauper, American singer-songwriter
- June 29 – Colin Hay, Scottish-born Australian rock singer-songwriter (Men at Work)
- July 2 – Mark Hart, American guitarist and keyboard player (Crowded House and Supertramp)
- July 6 – Nanci Griffith, American country folk singer-songwriter (Blue Moon Orchestra) (d. 2021)
- July 11 – Bramwell Tovey, British conductor (d. 2022)
- July 18 – Warren Wiebe, American singer (d. 1998)
- July 20 – Lourdes Ambriz, Mexican operatic soprano (d. 2025)
- July 21 – Eric Bazilian, American rock performer (The Hooters)
- July 22
  - Jimmy Bruno, American guitarist
  - Sylvia Chang, Taiwanese actress, singer, director and screenwriter
- July 29 – Geddy Lee, Canadian musician (Rush)
- July 31 – Hugh MacDowell (Electric Light Orchestra)
- August 1 – Robert Cray, blues guitarist and singer
- August 2 – Marjo, Canadian singer-songwriter (Corbeau)
- August 12
  - Jerry Speiser (Men at Work)
  - Peter Ostroushko, mandolinist, fiddler
- August 16 – James "J.T." Taylor (Kool & the Gang)
- August 17 – Kevin Rowland, vocalist (Dexys Midnight Runners)
- August 24 – Ron Holloway, tenor saxophonist
- August 27 – Alex Lifeson, progressive rock guitarist (Rush)
- August 29 – Rick Downey, rock drummer (Blue Öyster Cult)
- September 2 – John Zorn, composer
- September 7 – Benmont Tench, rock keyboardist (Tom Petty and the Heartbreakers etc.)
- September 11 – Tommy Shaw, hard rock guitarist (Styx)
- September 27
  - Greg Ham, pop rock multi-instrumentalist (Men at Work)
  - Robbie Shakespeare, reggae bassist (d. 2021)
- September 28 – Jim Diamond, pop singer-songwriter (Ph.D.) (d. 2015)
- October 7 – Tico Torres, rock percussionist Bon Jovi
- October 10 – Midge Ure, singer-songwriter
- October 14 – Kazumi Watanabe, jazz performer
- October 15 – Tito Jackson, pop singer (The Jackson 5) (d. 2024)
- October 16 – Tony Carey, rock keyboardist (Rainbow)
- October 21 – Charlotte Caffey, rock gitarist (The Go-Go's)
- October 21 – Eric Faulkner, guitarist and singer-songwriter (Bay City Rollers)
- October 26 – Keith Strickland (The B-52s)
- October 28 – Desmond Child, American songwriter and producer
- November 8 – Denyse Plummer, Trinidadian singer (d. 2023)
- November 11 – Andy Partridge, English musician (XTC)
- November 13
  - Keith Green, gospel singer-songwriter (d. 1982)
  - Andrew Ranken, Celtic punk drummer (The Pogues) (d. 2026)
- November 18 – Jan Kuehnemund, American guitarist (Vixen) (d. 2013)
- November 22 – Urmas Alender, singer (Ruja, Propeller)
- November 23 – Francis Cabrel, folk singer/songwriter
- November 28 – Taeko Onuki, Japanese singer-songwriter
- December 12
  - Bruce Kulick, American guitarist and songwriter (Kiss, Grand Funk Railroad, Blackjack, Union and Eric Singer Project)
  - Dave Meniketti, American singer-songwriter and guitarist (Y&T)
- December 15 – Hossam Ramzy, Egyptian percussionist (d. 2019)
- December 21 – András Schiff, Hungarian-born British pianist and conductor
- December 26 – Harry Christophers, English choral conductor
- December 30 – Graham Vick, English opera director (d. 2021)
- Undated – David Owen Norris, English classical pianist, composer, academic and broadcaster

== Deaths ==
- January 1 – Hank Williams, country musician, 29
- January 18 – Arthur Wood, composer, 78
- February 2 – Gustav Strube, conductor and composer, 75
- March 5
  - E. T. Cook, organist and composer, 72
  - Sergei Prokofiev, composer, 61
- March 19 – Irène Bordoni, singer and actress, 68
- March 29 – Arthur Fields, singer-songwriter, 64
- April 23 – Peter DeRose, Tin Pan Alley composer, 53
- April 29 – Kiki, "The Queen of Montparnasse", 51 (drug- and alcohol-related)
- April 30 – Lily Brayton, musical theatre star, 76
- May 10 – Marie Kunkel Zimmerman, soprano, 88
- May 15 – Mabel Love, dancer, 78
- May 16 – Django Reinhardt, jazz guitarist, 43 (brain hemorrhage)
- May 19 – Frank Mullings, tenor, 72
- May 22 – Frederick Jackson, librettist and screenwriter (66)
- May 30 – Dooley Wilson, actor, singer and pianist, 67
- June 3 – Florence Price, composer, 66
- June 10 – Grzegorz Fitelberg, conductor, violinist and composer, 73
- June 15 – Frank Tapp, composer, pianist and conductor
- June 21 – Ford Dabney, composer and vaudevillian, 75
- June 25 – Jules Van Nuffel, musicologist and composer, 70
- July 5 – Titta Ruffo, operatic baritone, 76
- July 17 – Bernhard van den Sigtenhorst Meyer, Dutch composer, 65
- August 14 – Friedrich Schorr, operatic bass-baritone, 64
- August 29 – Darrell Fancourt, bass-baritone, 67
- September 1 – Jacques Thibaud, violinist, 72
- September 21 – Roger Quilter, composer, 75
- October 3 – Sir Arnold Bax, composer, 69
- October 8 – Kathleen Ferrier, English contralto, 41 (cancer)
- October 18 – Marguerite d'Alvarez, operatic contralto, exact age unknown
- October 27 – Eduard Künneke, composer, 68
- October 29 – William Kapell, pianist, 31
- October 30 – Emmerich Kálmán, composer, 71
- November 10 – Theodora Morse, lyricist, 70
- November 18 – Ruth Crawford Seeger, composer, 52
- November 21 – Larry Shields, jazz musician, 60
- November 26 – Ivor Atkins, organist and choirmaster, 83
- November 30 – Norman Cocker, organist and composer, 63
- December 5
  - Noel Mewton-Wood, pianist, 31 (suicide by poisoning)
  - Jorge Negrete, singer and actor, 42 (hepatitis)
- December 9 – Issay Dobrowen, pianist, conductor and composer, 62
- December 11 – Albert Coates, conductor and composer, 71
- December 29 – Violet MacMillan, Broadway star, 66
