= List of compositions by Carlos Chávez =

This is a list of compositions by Carlos Chávez (1899–1978), in chronological order.

== List ==
Year	Title	Medium
1910	La danza de las brujas	piano
1911	Serenata	piano
1911	Canción	piano
1911	Barcarola (1)	piano
1911	Preludio	violin and piano
1911	Nocturno	piano
1912	Vals I and II	piano
1912	Miniatura	piano
1913	Serenata	violin and piano
1913	Romanza	violin and piano
1915	Segundo estudio de concerto	piano
1915	À l'aube: image mexicaine	piano
1915	Adelita & La cucaracha	piano
1915	Anda buscando de rosa en rosa	piano
1915/18	Symphony	orchestra
1916	Himno en elogio de la espada	chorus
1918	Berceuse	piano
1918	Pensamiento feliz	piano
1918	Carnaval	piano
1918	Oda I	piano
1918	Elegía I–II	piano
1918	Extase	voice and piano
1918	Gavota	piano
1918	Esperanza ingenua	piano
1918	Triste sonrisa	piano
1918	Suavemente	piano
1918	Meditación	piano
1918	Meine lieber Flamen	voice and piano
1918	Sonata fantasía (Sonata I)	piano
1919	Sextet for piano and strings	piano and strings
1919	Estrellas fijas (J.A. Silva)	soprano or tenor and piano
1919	Barcarola (2)	piano
1919	Du bist wie eine Blume (H. Heine)	soprano and piano
1919	Adiós, adiós	piano
1919/20	Valses íntimos I–IV	piano
1919/20	Estudios I–IV	piano
1920	Cuando empieza a caer la tarde	piano
1920	Preludio	piano
1920	Encanto sutil	piano
1920	Noche: aguafuerte	piano
1920	Hoja de álbum	piano
1920	Benedición	piano
1921	Vals Elegía	piano
1921	Madrigal	violoncello and piano
1921	Toxiumolpia: El fuego nuevo, Aztec ballet	chorus (soprano, alto) and orchestra
1921	String Quartet No. 1	chamber
1921/22	Madrigals I–VII	piano
1922	[4] Nocturnos	piano
1922	Jarabe	piano
1923	Polígonos	piano
1923	Inútil epigrama (R. de Carvalho)	soprano or tenor and piano
1923	Aspectos I–II	piano
1923	A l'aube: image mexicaine (Imagen mexicana), op. 17	chorus, unaccompanied
1923	[3] Piezas for guitarra	guitar
1923	[3] Exágonos	voice and piano
1924	Otros tres exágonos	voice and piano
1924	Xochimilco Dance	piano
1924	Sonatina for violoncello and piano	violoncello and piano
1924	Sonatina for violin and piano	violin and piano
1924	Sonatina for piano	piano
1925	Foxtrot	piano
1925	36 (initially called Horsepower, but later changed in order not to be confused with H.P.)	piano
1925	Los cuatro soles, indigenous ballet	soprano, chamber orchestra
1925	Energía	piccolo, flute, bassoon, horn, trumpet, bass trombone, viola, violoncello, double bass)
1925	Cake Walk	piano
1926	Solo	piano
1926	Chapultepec: Three Famous Mexican Pieces	band; arranged for orchestra in 1935
1926	[3] Etudes for piano … Chopin	piano
1926–32	Caballos de vapor [H.P.] (sinfonía de baile, Chávez) (Philadelphia, Metropolitan Opera House, 31 Mar 1932, director L. Stokowski)	orchestra
1927	H.P. Sinfonía de baile (also titled Caballos de vapor) (there is also a version for 2 pianos)	orchestra
1928	Blues	piano
1928	Piano Sonata No. 3	piano
1928	Fox	piano
1929	Sonata for 4 horns	4 horns
1930	Unidad	piano
1930	Paisaje	piano
1932	Tierra mojada	SATB chorus, oboe, and English horn; also arranged for unaccompanied chorus
1932	String Quartet No. 2	chamber
1932	Antígona (incidental music for the play by Sophocles in Jean Cocteau's translation)	Incidental music
1932	Todo (R. López Velarde, published together with North Carolina Blues as Dos canciones)	mezzo-soprano or barítone and piano
1933	Sinfonía de Antígona (Symphony No. 1)	orchestra
1933	Soli I	oboe, clarinet, bassoon, trumpet
1933	Cantos de México	orchestra
1934	Llamadas: sinfonía proletaria	chorus and orchestra
1934	El sol: corrido mexicano	chorus and orchestra
1934	[3] Spirals	violin and piano
1935	Chapultepec (Obertura republicana) [Marcha provinciana, Vals nostálgico, Canción de Adelita]	orchestra or band
1935/36	Sinfonía india (Symphony No. 2)	orchestra
1937	[10] Preludes for piano	piano
1937	Chaconne in E Minor (orchestration of Buxtehude's organ work)	orchestra
1937/38	Concerto for four horns and orchestra (adapted from the Sonata for four horns of 1929)	four horns and orchestra
1938	[3] Poems: "Segador" (Pellicer), "Hoy no lució la estrella de tus ojos" (S. Novo), "Nocturna rosa" (Villaurrutia)	soprano or tenor and piano
1938/40	Concerto for piano and orchestra	piano, orchestra
1939	[4] Nocturnos, for voice and piano	voice and piano
1939	La Paloma azul, coral	chorus
1940	For Juanita	piano
1940	Trio for flute, viola, and harp (arrangement of four pieces by Debussy and Falla)	flute, harp, and viola
1940	Xochipilli Macuilxóchitl (later retitled Xochipilli: An Imagined Aztec Music)	piccolo, flute, E♭ clarinet, trombone, and 6 percussionists
1941	La casada infiel (F. García Lorca)	mezzo-soprano or baritone and piano
1941	Sonata IV, for piano	piano
1941	Himno nacional (orchestration of work by Jaime Nunó)	orchestra
1942	Arbolucu, te sequeste (Tree of Sorrow)	chorus, unaccompanied
1942	Fugues for piano	piano
1942	"A Woman Is a Worthy Thing" (a cappella)	chorus, unaccompanied
1942	Toccata for percussion instruments	instrumental music (percussion)
1942	Melodías tradicionales indias del Ecuador [4], for voice and piano	vocal music (with piano)
1942	Miniatura: homenaje a Carl Deis	piano
1942	Nocturnes [3] (a cappella)	chorus, unaccompanied
1943	Danza de la pluma	piano
1943	La llorona	piano
1943	Concerto in G Minor, Op. 6 No. 1 (orchestration of Vivaldi)	orchestra
1943	La zandunga	piano
1943	Suite, for double quartet	chamber music
1943–44	The Daughter of Colchis: ballet in nine sections for double quartet	flute, oboe, clarinet, bassoon, two violins, viola, and cello
1944	La hija de Cólquide: suite for double quartet (six movements from the ballet)	flute, oboe, clarinet, bassoon, two violins, viola, and cello
1944	Saraband, for string orchestra (movement 7 from La hija de Cólquide)	string orchestra
1944	"A! Freedome"	chorus, unaccompanied
1946	String Quartet No. 3 (movements 2, 3, and 4 from La hija de Cólquide)	chamber
1946	Canto a la tierra	unison chorus, two horns, two trumpets, two trombones, and tuba; also a version for unison chorus and orchestra; also a version for unison chorus and piano
1947	La hija de Cólquide, symphonic suite from the ballet	orchestra
1947	Toccata for orchestra (incidental music for a scene in Don Quijote de la Mancha by Cervantes)	orchestra (incidental music)
1947–50	Concerto for violin and orchestra	violin, orchestra
1949	Estudio IV: homenaje a Chopin	piano
1950	Left Hand Inversions of Five Chopin Etudes	piano
1951	Symphony No. 3	orchestra
1951	Happy Birthday (a cappella)	chorus, unaccompanied
1952	[4] Nuevos estudios for piano	piano
1953	Symphony No. 5, for string orchestra (for the Koussevistky Foundation)	orchestra
1953	Symphony No. 4 Sinfonía romántica (For the Louisville Orchestra)	orchestra
1953	Baile: cuadro sinfónico (original final movement of the Symphony No. 4)	orchestra
1953/56	Panfilo and Lauretta (opera in three acts, libreto by Chester Kallman, after G. Boccaccio) (rev. as Love Propitiated, 1959; rev. as El amor propiciado (trad. N. Lindsay, E. Hernández Moncada), 1963; rev. as Los visitantes, 1968; revised as The Visitors, 1973)	opera
1956	Prometheus Bound	cantata for soprano, alto, tenor, baritone, and bass soloists, SATB chorus, and orchestra
1957	Upingos	oboe
1957	Hippolytus (incidental music for the play by Euripides): Upingos: melody for oboe solo)	Incidental music
1958	Invención (I)	piano
1958	North Carolina Blues (Villaurrutia), vocal	Vocal music (piano)
1960	Sonata V for piano	piano
1961	Symphony No. 6 (for the Lincoln Center of the Arts of New York)	orchestra
1961	Sonata VI for piano	piano
1961	Soli II for wind quintet	flute, oboe, clarinet, bassoon and horn
1962	Lamentaciones	voice and piano
1964	Tambuco	6 percussionists
1964	Resonancias	orchestra
1964	Fuga H A G, C	violin, viola, violoncello, double bass
1965	Soli III (bassoon, trumpet, viola, timpani and orchestra)	bassoon, trumpet, viola, timpani, and orchestra
1965	Invention II	violin, viola, violoncello
1966	Soli IV	horn, trumpet, trombone
1967	Mañanas mexicanas	piano; arranged for band (1974)
1967	Elatio, orchestra	orchestra
1967	Invention III	harp
1967	Vocalización aguda	soprano and piano
1968	Pirámide, ballet in four acts	ballet music for orchestra, SATB chorus, and magnetic tape
1968	Fragmento (a cappella speaking chorus, from Pirámide)	speaking chorus, unaccompanied
1969	Discovery, orchestra	orchestral music
1969	Variations, for violín and piano	Instrumental chamber music (duo)
1969	Clio: Symphonic Ode	orchestral music
1971	Initium, for orchestra	orchestral music
1972	Tema equis, publicity theme for Mexican Television	chorus and small instrumental ensemble
1972	Nonantzin (a cappella)	chorus, unaccompanied
1973	Estudio a Rubinstein	piano
1973	Partita, for timpani	solo music
1973	Sonante, for orchestra	orchestral music
1973	Paisajes mexicanos, for orchestra	orchestral music
1974	A Pastoral	chorus, unaccompanied
1974	NOKWIC	chorus, unaccompanied
1974	Feuille d'album for guitar	solo instrumental music (guitar)
1974	The Waning Moon	chorus, unaccompanied
1974	Sonante, for string orchestra	string orchestra
1974	Tzintzuntzan, symphonic variations for band	band music
1974	"Rarely" (a cappella)	chorus, unaccompanied
1974	Epistle (a cappella)	chorus, unaccompanied
1975	Concerto for violoncello and orchestra (unfinished)	orchestral music (concerto)
1975	Caprichos for piano [5]	piano
1976	Zandunga Serenade, for band	band
1976/77	Concerto for trombone and orchestra	trombone, orchestra
