= Symphony No. 5 =

Symphony No. 5 may refer to:

- Symphony No. 5 (Alwyn) (Hydriotaphia) by William Alwyn, 1972–73
- Symphony No. 5 (Arnold) (Op. 74) by Malcolm Arnold, 1961
- Symphony No. 5 (Badings) by Henk Badings, 1949
- Symphony No. 5 (Bax) by Arnold Bax, 1932
- Symphony No. 5 (Beethoven) in C minor (Op. 67, Fate) by Ludwig van Beethoven, 1804–08
- Symphony No. 5 (Bentoiu) (Op. 26) by Pascal Bentoiu, 1979
- Symphony No. 5 (Bruckner) in B♭ major (WAB 105, Fantastic) by Anton Bruckner, 1875–76
- Symphony No. 5 (Chávez) (Symphony for Strings) by Carlos Chávez, 1953
- Symphony No. 5 (Ching) (Kunstkammer) by Jeffrey Ching, 2004–05
- Symphony No. 5 (Davies) by Peter Maxwell Davies, 1994
- Symphony No. 5 (Diamond) by David Diamond, 1947–64
- Symphony No. 5 (Dvořák) in F major (Op. 76, B. 54) by Antonín Dvořák, 1875
- Symphony No. 5 (Enescu) in D major by George Enescu, 1941, completed by Pascal Bentoiu, 1995
- Symphony No. 5 (Ficher) (Op. 63, Asi habló Isaías) by Jacobo Ficher, 1947
- Symphony No. 5 (Gillis) In Memoriam by Don Gillis, 1944–45
- Symphony No. 5 (Glass) (Requiem, Bardo, Nirmanakaya) by Philip Glass, 1999
- Symphony No. 5 (Glazunov) in B♭ major (Op. 55, Heroic) by Alexander Glazunov, 1895
- Symphony No. 5 (Hanson) (Op.43, Sinfonia Sacra) by Howard Hanson, 1955
- Symphony No. 5 (Harbison) by John Harbison, 2008
- Symphony No. 5 (Harris) by Roy Harris, 1940–42, rev. 1945
- Symphony No. 5 (Haydn) in A major (Hoboken I/5) by Joseph Haydn, 1760–62
- Symphony No. 5 (Michael Haydn) in A major (Perger 3, Sherman 5, MH 63) by Michael Haydn, 1763
- Symphony No. 5 (Henze) by Hans Werner Henze, 1962
- Symphony No. 5 (Honegger) (Di tre re) by Arthur Honegger, 1950
- Symphony No. 5 (Mahler) by Gustav Mahler, 1901–02
- Symphony No. 5 (Martinů) (H. 310) by Bohuslav Martinů, 1946
- Symphony No. 5 (Melartin) (Op. 90, Sinfonia brevis) by Erkki Melartin, 1915
- Symphony No. 5 (Mendelssohn) in D (Op. 107, Reformation) by Felix Mendelssohn, 1830
- Symphony No. 5 (Mennin) by Peter Mennin, 1950
- Symphony No. 5 (Milhaud) (Op. 322) by Darius Milhaud, 1953
- Symphony No. 5 (Mozart) in B♭ major (K. 22) by Wolfgang Amadeus Mozart, 1765
- Symphony No. 5 (Nielsen) (Op. 50, FS 97) by Carl Nielsen, 1920–22
- Symphony No. 5 (Penderecki) (Korean) by Krzysztof Penderecki, 1991–92
- Symphony No. 5 (Piston) by Walter Piston, 1954
- Symphony No. 5 (Prokofiev) in B♭ major (Op. 100) by Sergei Prokofiev, 1944
- Symphony No. 5 (Raff) in E major (Op. 177, Lenore) by Joachim Raff, 1870–72
- Symphony No. 5 (Rautavaara) by Einojuhani Rautavaara, 1985–86
- Symphony No. 5 (Ries) in D minor (Op. 112) by Ferdinand Ries, 1813
- Symphony No. 5 (Rochberg) by George Rochberg, 1896
- Symphony No. 5 (Rouse) by Christopher Rouse, 2015
- Symphony No. 5 (Rubbra) (Op. 63) by Edmund Rubbra, 1947
- Symphony No. 5 (Sallinen) (Op. 57, Washington Mosaics) by Aulis Sallinen, 1984–85 (r. 1987)
- Symphony No. 5 (Schnittke) (Concerto Grosso No. 4) by Alfred Schnittke, 1988
- Symphony No. 5 (Schubert) in B♭ major (D. 485) by Franz Schubert, 1816
- Symphony No. 5 (Sessions) by Roger Sessions, 1960–64
- Symphony No. 5 (Shostakovich) in D minor (Op. 47) by Dmitri Shostakovich, 1937
- Symphony No. 5 (Sibelius) in E♭ major (Op. 82) by Jean Sibelius, 1915–19
- Symphony No. 5 (Simpson) by Robert Simpson, 1972
- Symphony No. 5 (Tchaikovsky) in E minor (Op. 64) by Pyotr Ilyich Tchaikovsky, 1888
- Symphony No. 5 (Ustvolskaya) (Amen) by Galina Ustvolskaya, 1989–90
- Symphony No. 5 (Vaughan Williams) in D major by Ralph Vaughan Williams, 1938–43
- Symphony No. 5 (Vieru) by Anatol Vieru, 1984–85
- Symphony No. 5 (Villa-Lobos) (W170, Peace) by Heitor Villa-Lobos, 1920
- Symphony No. 5 (Williamson) (Aquerò) by Malcolm Williamson, 1979–80

== See also ==
- Symphony for Organ No. 5 (Widor) in F minor (Op. 42 No. 1) by Charles-Marie Widor, 1879, including Widor's Toccata
- Symphony No. 5½ (Gillis) (A Symphony for Fun) by Don Gillis, 1946
