= Symphony No. 3 (Chávez) =

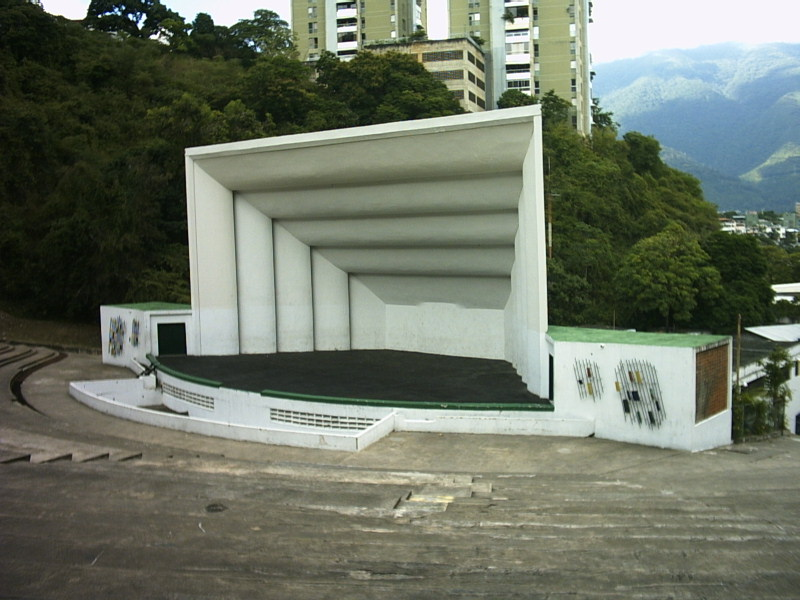
Anfiteatro José Ángel Lamas, Caracas, where Chávez's Third Symphony premiered

The Symphony No. 3 by Carlos Chávez was composed in 1951–1954 on a commission from Clare Boothe Luce, and is dedicated to the memory of her daughter, Anne Clare Brokaw.

== History ==
Chávez had evidently met former U.S. congresswoman, ambassador, publisher, playwright, and journalist Clare Boothe Luce in Florence at some point in the late 1940s. An unlikely friendship sprang up between them, which continued for nearly three decades. In February 1950 Luce came to Mexico City for a week of cultural exploration, and on 18 February 1950 wrote on a scrap of newspaper a commission for a musical work (initially envisioned as a piano concerto), "for Ann Clare Brokaw the most beautiful and sad and gay thing you ever wrote that has her lovely face and my broken heart in it". Brokaw, who had died as the result of an automobile accident in 1944 at the age of nineteen, was Mrs. Luce's only child, from her first marriage.

Composition of the Third Symphony began in 1951, but was interrupted repeatedly. After completing the first movement and a large part of the second, Chávez fell ill. By the time he recovered, there were more urgent deadlines requiring Chávez to put the score aside in order to work on the Fourth and Fifth Symphonies, both of which were completed before the Third. In April 1954 Chávez resumed work, completing the piano score on 14 June and the full score by the end of the same month. It was premiered in the Anfiteatro José Ángel Lamas in Caracas, Venezuela, by the Orquesta Sinfónica de Venezuela, conducted by the composer. According to Orbón, this was on 9 December 1954, though others put the date at 11 December 1954.( It received further performances, in Europe in June 1955 at the I.S.C.M. Festival in Baden-Baden (in an orchestral concert conducted by Ernest Bour), in London with the London Symphony Orchestra conducted by Juan José Castro (29 November 1955), and in the United States, with the New York Philharmonic conducted by the composer (26 January 1956). Thanks to the efforts of his friend Aaron Copland, Chávez was able to secure a contract with Boosey & Hawkes in 1955, and the Third Symphony was the first of his works published by that firm.

== Instrumentation ==
The symphony is scored for piccolo, two flutes, two oboes, cor anglais, E♭ clarinet, two clarinets, bass clarinet, three bassoons (third doubling contrabassoon), four horns, three trumpets, three trombones, tuba, timpani, percussion (three players), harp, and strings.

== Analysis ==
The Third Symphony consists of four movements:

1. Introduzione: Andante moderato
2. Allegro
3. Scherzo
4. Finale

The opening movement introduces a number of thematic elements that will be developed throughout the symphony—a procedure known as cyclic form. The character at the outset is dramatic and tense, recalling somewhat the "Greek" style of the Sinfonía de Antígona and the ballet La hija de Cólquide. Later in the movement (at rehearsal-number 16), a jarring contrast is created when Chávez introduces a universally familiar five-note children's chant, a figure that is also found in a number of the composer's contemporaneous and earlier works—the Fourth Symphony, the choral works Tierra mojada and Llamadas, and the ballet Caballos de vapor—whose presence here may be explained by a hidden program connected to the terms of the Symphony's commission

After the slow first movement, the fast tempo and sonata-allegro design of the second movement more closely resembles the traditional opening movement of a symphony. This Allegro is the main focus of the symphony because of the solidity of its formal structure and its greater length than the other movements. To describe it as a sonata-allegro, however, refers to its character but not its form, which is both simple and original. Chávez replaces the usual exposition–development–recapitulation with two alternating sections, each of which occurs three times. Development occurs during the appearances of the second of these, through either the reappearance of motives from the first section, or the production from them of variants.

== Discography ==
- The Six Symphonies of Carlos Chávez. Orquesta Sinfónica Nacional de México; Carlos Chávez, cond. 3-LP set (stereo). CBS Masterworks 32 31 0002 (32 11 0020, 32 11 0022, 32 11 0024). New York: CBS, 1967.
- The Six Symphonies of Carlos Chávez. London Symphony Orchestra; Eduardo Mata, cond. 3-LP set (stereo). Vox Cum Laude 3D-VCL 9032. New York: Moss Music Group, 1983. Reissued on 2-CD set as Carlos Chávez: The Complete Symphonies. VoxBox2 CDX 5061. Hauppauge, NY: Moss Music Group, 1992. Partial reissue on CD: Carlos Chávez: Symphonies Nos. 1, 2 & 3. Vox Cum Laude MCD 10002. New York: Moss Music Group, 1983. This CD also reissued as Vox Unique VU 9020. Hackensack, New Jersey: Vox Unique, 1990.
