= Suite Hébraïque =

- by Ernest Bloch
- Genre: Modern
- Composed: 1951
- Performed: 1952
- Published: 1953
- Movements: 3
- Scoring: Viola and piano Viola and orchestra

Suite Hébraïque is a 3-movement work composed in 1951 for viola and piano by Ernest Bloch, which he subsequently arranged for viola and small orchestra. The piece draws upon Jewish music, and it simulates the blow of a shofar. Suite Hébraïque is similar in style to another of Bloch's compositions, Baal Shem for violin and orchestra (1939).

== Background ==
Bloch had composed six pieces, known as the Jewish Cycle, between 1911 and 1916, and last of these was Schelomo: Rhapsodie Hébraïque for Violoncello and Orchestra. When he immigrated to the United States in 1916 and settled in New York City, Bloch renewed his study of Jewish music.

In 1950 the Chicago Federation of the Union of American Hebrew Congregations organized a weeklong celebration of Bloch's music to mark the composer's 70th birthday. Violist Milton Preves, who had performed Bloch's Suite for Viola and Orchestra (1919) at the celebration, asked the composer to write pieces for viola similar to Baal Shem. Bloch began working on Five Jewish Pieces to show his gratitude after the Chicago event, and he revised the Pieces into two separate works: Suite Hébraïque and Meditation and Processional. Suite Hébraïque later was dedicated to the Covenant Club of Illinois, possibly for sponsoring the world premiere of all five pieces and for promoting their first recording in 1952. Meditation and Processional was dedicated to Preves.

== Movements ==
- Rapsodie
- Processional
- Affirmation
