= Domani =

1955 song written by Ulpio Minucci and Tony Velona

"Domani" (Italian for "tomorrow") is a 1955 song written by Ulpio Minucci with lyrics by Tony Velona. The melody is based on the intermezzo from the comic opera I Quattro Rusteghi by Ermanno Wolf-Ferrari.

The most popular version of the song was recorded in 1955 by Julius LaRosa, released by Cadence Records as catalog number 1265. It first reached the Billboard magazine charts on July 13, 1955 and lasted 7 weeks on the chart, peaking at #13.

The song was rendered in French - retaining the title "Domani" - by Renée Lebas; a Finnish rendering: "Huomenna", was recorded by Maynie Sirén.

Another song of the same name was released by the Twilight Singers on the "Black Is the Color of My True Love's Hair" EP and on Greg Dulli's 2005 album Amber Headlights.

== Other recordings ==
- Bing Crosby recorded the song in 1955 for use on his radio show and it was subsequently included in the box set The Bing Crosby CBS Radio Recordings (1954-56) issued by Mosaic Records (catalog MD7-245) in 2009.
- Tony Martin - a single release in 1955.
