= Symphony No. 4 (Chávez) =

Symphony No. 4, subtitled Sinfonía romántica (Romantic Symphony) is an orchestral composition by Carlos Chávez, composed in 1953.

The score was commissioned by and is dedicated to the Louisville Orchestra, which premiered the work on 11 February 1953, conducted by the composer. After the first few performances, Chávez decided that the final movement, though sound in itself, was not satisfactory as a conclusion to this symphony. Consequently, he composed a new finale in October 1953, and published the original movement as a separate work, titled Baile (cuadro sinfónico) (Dance, Symphonic Picture).

== Music ==
The symphony is scored for an orchestra of three flutes (third doubling piccolo), two oboes, cor anglais, two clarinets, three bassoons (third doubling contrabassoon), four horns, two trumpets, three trombones, tuba, timpani, percussion (three players), and strings.

The symphony is divided into three movements:

1. Allegro
2. Molto lento
3. Vivo non troppo mosso

In contrast to the Third Symphony, there are no formal innovations here. The symphony is in the key of A—a sort of A minor tonality—though the overall character is brighter and more optimistic than the Third Symphony. Chávez treats his material cyclically, which means that thematic elements reappear throughout all three movements.

== Discography ==
- Carlos Chávez: Sinfonía india, Sinfonía de Antígona, Sinfonía romántica. Stadium Symphony Orchestra, Carlos Chávez, cond. LP recording. Everest LPBR 6029 (monaural), SDBR 3029 (stereo). [Los Angeles]: Everest Records, 1959. Reissued on CD (with the orchestra named as New York Stadium Symphony Orchestra), Philips Legendary Classics 422 305–2. [West Germany]: Philips Classics Productions, 1989. Reissued on CD, Everest EVC-9041. New York: Everest Records, 1996. ["Stadium Symphony Orchestra" is the name taken by the New York Philharmonic for its summer performances in the Lewisohn Stadium.]
- Chávez: Sinfonía de Antígona, Symphony No. 4 Sinfonía romántica; Revueltas: Caminos, Música para charlar, Ventanas. Royal Philharmonic Orchestra (Chávez); Orquesta Filarmónica de la Ciudad de México (Revueltas); Enrique Bátiz, cond. CD recording (stereo). ASV Digital CD DCA 653. London: Academy Sound and Vision Ltd., 1989. Repackaged with additional material, as Symphony no. 1 Sinfonía de Antigona (1933); Symphony no. 2 Sinfonía india (1935–36); La hija de Cólquide = The Daughter of Colchis: Symphonic Suite (1943); Symphony no. 4 Sinfonía romántica (1953); Baile = Dance: Symphonic Painting (1953). ASV CD DCA 1058. London: Academy Sound and Vision, 1999.
- The Six Symphonies of Carlos Chávez . Orquesta Sinfónica Nacional de México; Carlos Chávez, cond. 3-LP set (stereo). CBS Masterworks 32 31 0002 (32 11 0020, 32 11 0022, 32 11 0024). New York: CBS, 1967.
- The Six Symphonies of Carlos Chávez. London Symphony Orchestra; Eduardo Mata, cond. 3-LP set (stereo). Vox Cum Laude 3D-VCL 9032. New York: Moss Music Group, 1983. Reissued on 2-CD set as Carlos Chávez: The Complete Symphonies. VoxBox2 CDX 5061. Hauppauge, New York: Moss Music Group, 1992.
- Música Méxicana Vol. 7: Chávez: Cantos de México, Toccata for Orchestra, Paisajes mexicanos, La hija de Cólquide, Baile (Cuadro sinfónico) [the original fourth movement of Symphony No. 4]. Claudia Coonce, oboe; The State of Mexico Symphony Orchestra; Enrique Bátiz, cond. CD recording (stereo). ASV Digital CD DCA 927. London: Academy Sound and Vision Ltd., 1995.
- Leonard Bernstein: Historical Recordings 1941–1961. 12-CD set. West Hill Radio Archives WHRA-6048. [Europe]: West Hill Radio Archives, 2013. CD 11 includes Chávez's Symphony No. 4, performed by the New York Philharmonic conducted by Leonard Bernstein, recorded 8 February 1960 in Carnegie Hall, New York City.
