= Eh, Cumpari! =

Single by Julius La Rosa
- Released: 1953
- Label: Cadence
- Songwriter(s): Julius La Rosa, Archie Bleyer

"Eh, Cumpari!" is a novelty song. It was adapted from a traditional Italian song by Julius La Rosa and Archie Bleyer in 1953 and sung by La Rosa with Bleyer's orchestra as backing on a recording that year.

The song is a cumulative song, in which each verse contains all of the previous verses as well. It is sung in Sicilian and is about the sounds of musical instruments.

== Commercial success and cover versions ==
The song reached #1 on the Cash Box chart and #2 on the Billboard chart in 1953. As a result, the song was also featured in a performance by Dennis Day on The Jack Benny Program on CBS Radio.

In the mid-1970s The Gaylords recorded another popular version for an Alitalia Airlines commercial, in the middle of which is read a comical letter from someone in "the old country" culminating with a joke about Alitalia.

The song also appeared in the soundtrack to Francis Ford Coppola's film The Godfather Part III, sung by Talia Shire as Connie Corleone.

Washington D.C. radio shock jock "The Greaseman" regularly used the song as one of his "bits" during the 1980s.

The rock group Chicago referred to "Eh, Cumpari!" in some performances of the song "Saturday in the Park" with the line:

"a man selling ice cream, singing Italian songs, 'Eh, Cumpari! Ci vo sunari,' can you dig it? yes I can!"

The song was used in season 15 episode 4 of the television show American Dad! titled “Shell Game” which aired February 26, 2018.

The song was also used and credited in the 2022 surfing short film 'Gravity' featuring John John Florence.

== Translation ==
A rough translation reads as follows:

Hey buddy, [music] is playing.
What is playing? The whistle.
And what does it sound like—the whistle?
[vocalized instrument sound] the whistle, tippiti tippiti ta
etc.

- u friscalettu = whistle [small flute]
- u saxofona = saxophone
- u mandulinu = mandolin
- u viulinu = violin
- la trumbetta = trumpet
- la trombona = trombone
