= Corbeau (band) =

Canadian rock band

- Origin: Quebec, Canada
- Genre: Rock
- Years active: 1977–1984
- Spinoff of: Offenbach
- Past members: Roger Belval; Donald Hince; Michel Lamothe; Jean Millaire; Marjolène Morin; Pierre Harel

Corbeau was a popular 1970s Quebecois rock group. The group was formed in 1977 by the film-maker, lyricist and singer Pierre Harel, with Michel "Willie" Lamothe on bass guitar, Jean Millaire on guitar, Roger "Wézo" Belval on drums (all previously members of the group Offenbach) and Donald Hince on guitars. Harel was the lead singer until the arrival of Marjolène Morin; the two shared the role until the departure of Harel just before the 1979 launch of their first album Corbeau. The band performed at the 1981 ADISQ Awards ceremony at the Expo Theatre in Quebec. Corbeau broke up in 1984 after the departure of Marjo and Jean Millaire.

In 2009 the original members re-united to record one track for Marjo's new album, Marjo et ses hommes. Corbeau re-recorded the track Demain.

== Members ==
- Pierre Harel: vocals (1977-1979)
- Marjolène Morin: vocals
- Donald Hince: guitar
- Jean Millaire: guitar, back up vocals
- Michel Lamothe: bass, back up vocals
- Roger Belval: drums

== Discography ==
- 1979: Corbeau
- 1981: Fou
- 1982: Illégal
- 1983: Visionnaire (Extended play)
- 1984: Dernier cri (Live album)
- 1992: L'intégrale (Best of)

=== Corbeau 85 ===
- 2005: Hôtel Univers

This incarnation included original members Pierre Harel, Michel Lamothe, Roger Belval & Donald Hinse

== Corbach ==
This was another incarnation including members of the original Corbeau : Pierre Harel, Donald Hince, Michel Lamothe, Roger Belval

- 1991 : Rite Rock
- 1996 : Amérock du nord
- 2002 : Félix en colère

== Corbeau 85 - Corbach ==
- 2004 : Rockollection

== Pierre Harel solo ==
- 1988 : Tendre ravageur
- 2005 : Rock ma vie
