= Julius La Rosa =

Italian-American singer (1930–2016)

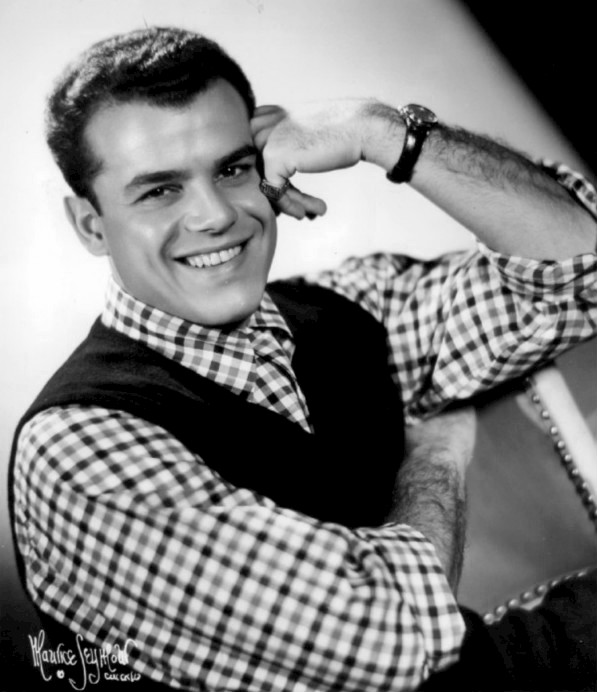
- La Rosa in 1955

Background information
- Born: January 2, 1930; New York, U.S.
- Died: May 12, 2016 (aged 86) Crivitz, Wisconsin, U.S.
- Genre: Traditional pop
- Occupation: Vocalist
- Years active: 1951–2016
- Labels: Cadence; RCA Victor; Roulette; Kapp; MGM; Crewe; Metromedia; His Master's Voice
- Website: Official Julius La Rosa website (archived)
- Spouse: Rosemary Meyer (m. 1956)

Julius La Rosa (January 2, 1930 – May 12, 2016) was an American traditional popular music singer, who worked in both radio and television beginning in the 1950s.

== Early years ==
La Rosa was born of Italian-immigrant parents in Brooklyn. He attended P.S. 123K in Bushwick. At age 17, he joined the United States Navy after finishing high school, becoming a radioman. He sang in a Navy choir, at the officers' club, and at bars to pay for his drinks.

== Heyday with Arthur Godfrey ==
La Rosa's Navy peers promoted him to Arthur Godfrey, one of America's leading radio and television personalities and a Naval Reserve officer himself. George Andrews from Omaha, Nebraska, was a mechanic on Godfrey's airplane, and he struck up a conversation with Godfrey and told him that he should hear his friend sing. They arranged a time for La Rosa to audition in Pensacola, Florida where La Rosa was stationed. Godfrey was impressed and offered him a job. He had La Rosa flown to New York to appear on his television show, with Godfrey ending the spot by saying, "When Julie gets out of the Navy he'll come back to see us." La Rosa was discharged from the Navy on a Friday in November 1951, and he went to Godfrey on the following Monday and appeared on his variety show a week later. He was a regular on both the morning Arthur Godfrey Time and the Wednesday night variety show Arthur Godfrey and His Friends.

La Rosa was on Godfrey's shows from November 19, 1951 to October 19, 1953. Godfrey's band leader Archie Bleyer formed Cadence Records in 1952, and La Rosa was the first performer with whom they signed a contract. Cadence's first single was also La Rosa's first recording of "Anywhere I Wander". It reached the top 30 on the charts, and his next recording was "My Lady Loves to Dance", a moderate success. Between his popular records and his appearances on Godfrey's shows, La Rosa's popularity grew exponentially. At one point, his fan mail eclipsed Godfrey's. A year after La Rosa was hired, he was receiving 7,000 fan letters a week.

== Backstage turmoil ==
Arthur Godfrey's management style was a combination of paternal affection and dictatorial direction. Years of speaking his mind, on and off the air, had conditioned him to do exactly as he pleased. He regarded his employees as a family (the cast members were known as "the Little Godfreys") and he took an interest in them personally, but he was the boss and his word was law. Godfrey had discouraged La Rosa and all other cast members from hiring a manager or booking agent; Godfrey preferred to handle these matters internally, with his staff coordinating and negotiating on the artists' behalf.

One of Godfrey's mandates was for all cast members to attend dance classes, to make them appear more graceful on camera. La Rosa did not comply, claiming a family emergency. Shortly thereafter, La Rosa hired a personal agent and manager, Tommy Rockwell (Rockwell had worked with Louis Armstrong in the twenties and the Dorsey Brothers band in the thirties).

Godfrey did not react well to receiving a formal notification that La Rosa had hired Rockwell. After consulting with CBS president Frank Stanton, Godfrey went before the TV cameras for Arthur Godfrey Time on the morning of October 19, 1953. After the televised portion of the program went off the air, the broadcast continued on the radio network. La Rosa sang "Manhattan" and Godfrey fired him on the air, announcing that La Rosa had become "his own star" and "that was Julie's swan song with us." La Rosa did not return to the microphone.

La Rosa tearfully met with Godfrey after the broadcast and thanked him for giving him his "break." La Rosa was then met at Godfrey's offices by his lawyer, his manager Tommy Rockwell, and some reporters. Rockwell was highly critical of Godfrey's behavior, angrily citing La Rosa's public humiliation.

Godfrey subsequently explained that La Rosa had been fired because he lacked "humility." This comment backfired badly on Godfrey. Stanton regretted the on-air dismissal, later admitting, "Maybe it was a mistake." Comedians began working the phrase "no humility" into their routines. Singer Ruth Wallis, known for her raunchy double entendre novelty songs, recorded "Dear Mr. Godfrey", a biting satire on the matter, which made it to #25 on the Billboard charts in November 1953.

Almost immediately after firing La Rosa, Godfrey also fired bandleader Archie Bleyer, owner of La Rosa's label Cadence Records, for producing spoken-word records for Cadence featuring Chicago-based talk host Don McNeill. Godfrey considered this an act of treason. Don McNeill's Breakfast Club aired on ABC Radio one hour ahead of Godfrey's CBS morning show, although McNeill's success was nowhere on a par with that of Godfrey.

== After Godfrey ==
The firing did not hurt La Rosa's career in the short run. Ed Sullivan immediately signed La Rosa for appearances on his CBS Toast of the Town TV variety show, which sparked a feud between Sullivan and Godfrey. La Rosa's first appearance on Toast of the Town following the firing (November 1, 1953) got a 47.9 Trendex rating; La Rosa would appear 12 more times on Sullivan's show that year.

Shortly after he left Godfrey, La Rosa's third recording, "Eh, Cumpari", hit #1 on the Cash Box chart and #2 on the Billboard chart, with La Rosa getting an award as the best new male vocalist of 1953. "Eh, Cumpari" was followed by another major hit, "Domani". For thirteen weeks during the summer of 1955, La Rosa had a three-times-a-week television series on CBS, The Julius La Rosa Show, featuring Russ Case and his Orchestra. The Julius La Rosa Show aired in an hour-long format in the summers of 1956 and 1957 at 8 p.m. Eastern on Saturdays on NBC as a seasonal replacement for The Perry Como Show (Como previously had La Rosa, on occasion, fill in for him during the 1954-55 season of his CBS series.)

In 1981, Peter Kelley, who handled Godfrey's commercial bookings, suggested the host reunite with cast members from his morning show and record a reunion album. Though Godfrey initially balked, recalling his disputes with La Rosa and other cast members, he agreed to a meeting, and was amenable to having La Rosa participate. La Rosa, feeling sufficient time had passed, was also amenable. At the meeting, held at Godfrey's Manhattan office, Godfrey brought up the firing and asked La Rosa why he did not tell the "truth" as Godfrey saw it: that La Rosa had asked to be released from his contract and Godfrey had obliged. When La Rosa started to respond by reminding him of the dance-class dispute, Godfrey exploded in anger. La Rosa left, and any talk of a reunion show ended. La Rosa tired of revisiting the Godfrey affair, in part because it had been rehashed so many times, but he was also known to acknowledge Godfrey as the one individual who made his career. Nevertheless, La Rosa always added, "He wasn't a very nice man [to me]."

== Later career ==
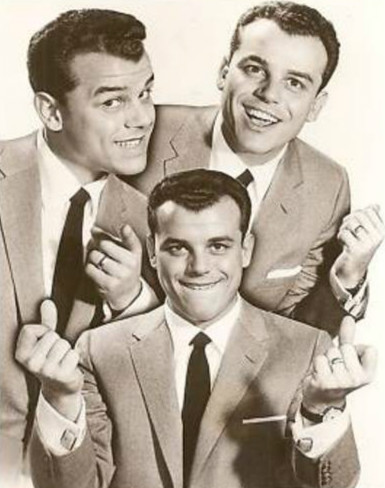
Promotional photo of La Rosa for his 1957 summer replacement television show.

La Rosa appeared in a range of television shows, including The Honeymooners in 1953, What's My Line?, The Pat Boone Chevy Showroom, The Polly Bergen Show (two episodes, including the 1957 premiere), The Merv Griffin Show and Laverne and Shirley in 1980. He starred in the 1958 film Let's Rock. In 1977, he hosted an unsold game show pilot for NBC, Noot's Game.

In 1970, La Rosa became a disc jockey at Metromedia's WNEW-AM 1130 in New York City. He hosted the 1:00–4:00 p.m. time slot at least through 1976, following William B. Williams' show which would eventually again become the Make Believe Ballroom. During his first tenure at WNEW, the station was more of an adult contemporary format rather than the traditional standards La Rosa was known for. He also sang some songs that were hits on the station. Those included: "Fire and Rain," from the "Words" album (Metromedia label) in 1971, "What'll I Do," and "Save Me a Song" (RCA Victor label)." He also recorded "We Need a Little Christmas" (1966), played during the holiday season on "the Big W." La Rosa would return to WNEW in the 1980s, doing various air shifts after the station returned to standards and big bands.

In the 1980s, La Rosa received a non-contract, recurring role in the NBC soap opera Another World, playing the character Reynoldo, for which he was nominated for a Daytime Emmy Award as Best Supporting Actor.

In 1998 and 1999, La Rosa was a disc jockey on 1430 WNSW based in Newark, New Jersey, hosting Make Believe Ballroom Time. La Rosa, profiled by jazz critic and composer Gene Lees, continued to work clubs and release records until the early 2000s. New York Times film critic Stephen Holden said "His singing is very direct and unpretentious – he can wrap his voice tenaciously around a melody line and bring out the best in it."

La Rosa was a frequent contributor to comedian Jerry Lewis's annual Labor Day telethon programmes for the Muscular Dystrophy Association, often hosting the New York venue of the shows.

== Personal life ==
In 1953, La Rosa was romantically linked with then-married Dorothy McGuire of The McGuire Sisters. In 1955, while serving as the summer replacement on Perry Como's TV show, he met Como's secretary, Rosemary Meyer, and married her.

In 2008, La Rosa said, "Music is a very egotistical thing [...] It makes me feel good [...] and fortunately, I have the capacity to make people feel good who hear me feeling good."

He and his wife lived for over 40 years in Irvington, New York, until November 2015 when they moved to Crivitz, Wisconsin, where he died of natural causes on May 12, 2016, at age 86.

== Discography ==
=== Albums ===
- Julius La Rosa (RCA Victor, 1956)
- The Port of Love (Guest Star, 1959)
- Love Songs à La Rosa (Roulette, 1959)
- On the Sunny Side (Roulette, 1959)
- The New Julie La Rosa (Kapp, 1961)
- You're Gonna Hear from Me (MGM, 1966)
- Hey, Look Me Over (MGM, 1967)
- Words (Metromedia, 1971)
- Julius La Rosa (Project 3 Records, 1987)

=== Singles ===
Year	Single (A-side, B-side) Both sides from same album except where indicated	Chart positions			Album
Year	Single (A-side, B-side) Both sides from same album except where indicated	Hot 100	CB	AC	Album
1953	"This Is Heaven" /	21	—	—	Top Hits
1953	"Anywhere I Wander"	4	7	—	Top Hits
1953	"My Lady Loves to Dance" b/w "Let's Make Up Before We Say Goodnight" (from Top Hits)	21	16	—	Non-album tracks
1953	"Eh, Cumpari! /	2	1	—	Non-album tracks
1953	"Till They've All Gone Home"	—	23	—	Non-album tracks
1954	"I Couldn't Believe My Eyes" /	—	28	—	Top Hits
1954	"The Big Bell and the Little Bell"	—	32	—	Non-album track
1954	"My Funny Valentine" b/w "Roseanne"	—	—	—	Top Hits
1954	"Have a Heart" b/w "When You're In Love" (from Top Hits)	—	34	—	Non-album track
1954	"Three Coins in the Fountain" b/w "Me Gotta Have You" (Non-album track)	21	—	—	Top Hits
1954	"My Heart's on a Fast Express" b/w "In My Own Quiet Way"	—	—	—	Non-album tracks
1954	"Mobile" b/w "I Hate to Say Hello"	21	21	—	Non-album tracks
1954	"Campanelle" b/w "I Hope You'll Be Very Happy"	—	—	—	Non-album tracks
1954	"Jingle Dingle" b/w "Campanelle"	—	—	—	Non-album tracks
1955	"Pass It On" b/w "Let's Stay Home Tonight"	—	—	—	Non-album tracks
1955	"Domani" (Tomorrow)	13	13	—	Top Hits
1955	"Mama Rosa"	—	37	—	Non-album track
1955	"Suddenly There's a Valley" b/w "Everytime That I Kiss Carrie" (Non-album track)	20	8	—	Top Hits
1956	"Lipstick and Candy and Rubbersole Shoes" b/w "Winter in New England"	15	37	—	Non-album tracks
1956	"I've Got Love" b/w "Augustine"	93	—	—	Non-album tracks
1956	"Get Me to the Church on Time" b/w "I've Grown Accustomed to Her Face"	89	—	—	Non-album tracks
1956	"Namely You" b/w "The Opposite Sex"	—	—	—	Non-album tracks
1956	"Priscilla" b/w "All I Want"	—	31	—	Non-album tracks
1957	"Stashu Pandowski" b/w "Jeannette"	—	36	—	Non-album tracks
1957	"Crying My Heart Out for You" b/w "When You're With the One You Love"	—	—	—	Non-album tracks
1957	"Worlds Apart" b/w "Famous Last Words"	—	—	—	Non-album tracks
1957	"Just Forever" b/w "Since When (Is It a Sin)"	—	—	—	Non-album tracks
1958	"Lover, Lover" b/w "A Heart for a Heart"	—	—	—	Non-album tracks
1958	"Mama Guitar" b/w "Man to Man"	98	57	—	Non-album tracks
1958	"Torero" b/w "Milano"	21	—	—	Non-album tracks
1958	"Until He Gets a Girl" b/w "Let Nature Take Its Course"	—	—	—	The Port of Love
1959	"Protect Me" b/w "Where's the Girl"	—	—	—	The Port of Love
1959	"Honey Bunch" b/w "Port of Love"	—	—	—	The Port of Love
1960	"Green Fields" b/w "Your Hand in Mine"	—	—	—	Non-album tracks
1960	"Bewitched" b/w "It's All Right with Me"	—	—	—	Non-album tracks
1961	"Let Your Lips Tell Me" b/w "Seventeen"	—	—	—	Non-album tracks
1961	"There's No Other Love" b/w "Caress Me"	—	—	—	Non-album tracks
1962	"You Can't Keep Me from Loving You" b/w "If I Had My Way"	—	—	—	Non-album tracks
1964	"Je" b/w "Gonna Build a Mountain"	—	—	—	Non-album tracks
1966	"You're Gonna Hear from Me" b/w "Lonely as I Leave You" (Non-album track)	—	—	21	You're Gonna Hear from Me
1966	"We Need a Little Christmas" b/w "I Can't Believe I'm Losing You" (Non-album track)	—	—	—	You're Gonna Hear from Me
1966	"I Think It's Going to Rain Today" b/w "You Only See Her"	—	—	—	You're Gonna Hear from Me
1966	"Our Venetian Affair" b/w "We Need a Little Christmas" (from You're Gonna Hear from Me)	—	—	—	Hey, Look Me Over
1967	"Summer Love" b/w "For Once in My Life"	—	—	—	Non-album tracks
1969	"Where Do I Go" b/w "This Is All I Had"	—	—	24	Non-album tracks
1970	"Being Alive" b/w "Brooklyn Roads" (Non-album track)	—	—	—	Words
1973	"The Good Life" b/w "Save Me a Song"	—	—	—	Non-album tracks
1981	"A Christmas Gift" b/w "To Find Our Children"	—	—	—	Non-album tracks
