= Tambuco (Chávez) =

Ensemble by Carlos Chávez

- by Carlos Chávez
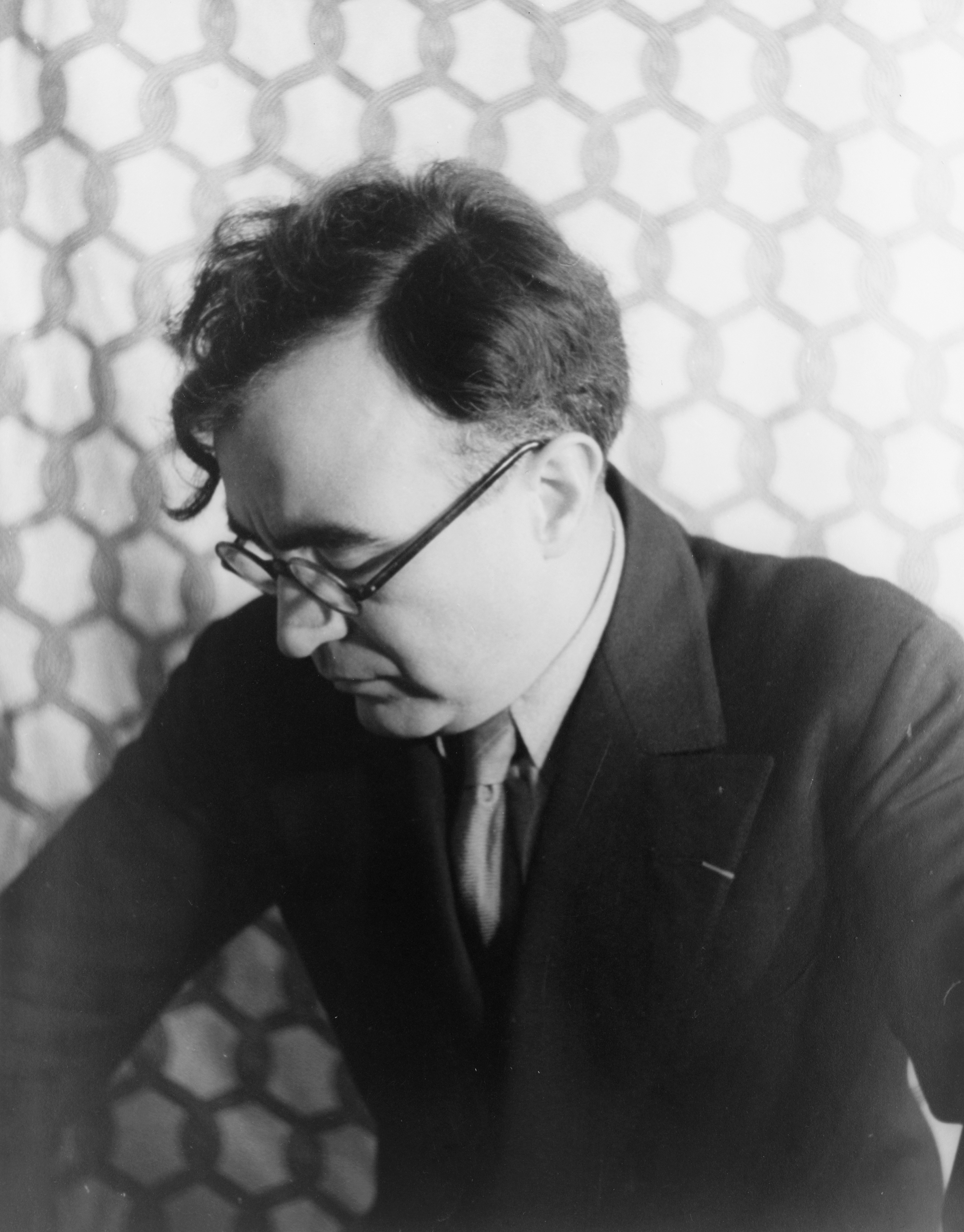
- Portrait of Carlos Chávez by Carl van Vechten (1937)
- Composed: 1964
- Published: 1967
- Movements: 1

Premiere
- Date: 11 October 1965
- Location: Leo S. Bing Theater at the Los Angeles County Museum of Art
- Conductor: William Kraft
- Performers: Los Angeles Percussion Ensemble

Tambuco is a percussion-ensemble work for six players, written by the Mexican composer Carlos Chávez in 1964. The score is dedicated to Clare Boothe Luce, and a performance of it lasts approximately thirteen minutes.

== History ==
The impulse to compose Tambuco came about in an unusual way. In 1950, Clare Boothe Luce had commissioned Chávez's Third Symphony, completed in 1954. Their unlikely friendship continued for nearly three decades and, after Luce began working in mosaics in 1963, they agreed to exchange commissions for works from each other. For Chávez, Luce created a 4' x 5' mosaic titled Golden Tiger, which he hung in his Lomas de Chapultepec studio in Mexico City. In return, he created Tambuco.

The premiere took place on 11 October 1965 in the Leo S. Bing Theater at the Los Angeles County Museum of Art, performed by the Los Angeles Percussion Ensemble conducted by William Kraft. Both Chávez and Luce were in the audience.

== Instrumentation ==
Each of the six performers plays a battery of at least six different instruments. Pitched percussion is found in each of the players' groups, which also each include wood, metal, and membrane instruments. The total array is:

Percussion I

- Small rasping stick
- Small water gourd
- Glockenspiel
- Small claves
- Very small bongo set
- Medium bongo set

Percussion II

- Large rasping stick
- Large water gourd
- Large suspended cymbal
- Swiss brass bells
- Wood block
- Group of drums:
  - Small snare drum
  - Medium snare drum
  - Tenor drum

Percussion III

- Metal rattle (or shaken tambourine)
- Maraca
- Triangle
- Tubular chimes
- Large claves
- Four timpani

Percussion IV

- Clay (or hard cardboard) rattle
- Soft rattle (soft cardboard or straw)
- Maraca
- Very large crash cymbals
- Marimba
- Extra-large claves
- Group of drums:
  - Small tom tom
  - Large tom tom
  - Conga

Percussion V

- Small güiro
- Large güiro (shared with Percussion VI)
- Extra-large ratchet
- Tap-a-tap (two rectangular pieces of thin wood with handles)
- Celesta
- Extra-large gong
- Group of drums:
  - Small snare drum
  - Medium snare drum
  - Tenor drum
- Xylophone (shared with Percussion VI)

Percussion VI

- Sand blocks (two sets, with rough and fine sandpaper)
- Large güiro (shared with Percussion V)
- Very small suspended cymbal
- Vibraphone (three octaves)
- Xylophone (shared with Percussion V)
- Group of drums:
  - Small bass drum
  - Large bass drum

== Analysis ==
Instead of the conventional procedures of thematic repetition and development, Tambuco unfolds in what the composer describes as "a constant process of consequent evolution. That is to say, an initial idea serves as an 'antecedent' to a 'consequent', which in turn immediately becomes an antecedent to a new consequent, and so on until the end of the piece". Chávez elsewhere characterizes such a procedure as being "like a spiral".

The work falls into three main sections, each characterized by the predominance of certain instruments:

1. Rasps, rattles, and blocks (b. 1–158)
2. Definite-pitched instruments (glockenspiel, celesta, vibraphone, chimes, and marimba, b. 159–207), ending with a xylophone transition passage (b. 208–15)
3. Timpani, bongos, conga, and bass drums (b. 216–283).

This main structure is followed by a coda (beginning in b. 284) in which the definite-pitched instruments gradually re-enter, leading to an abrupt ending.
