= Symphony No. 10 (Villa-Lobos) =

- Sumé pater patrium: Sinfonia ameríndia com coros
- Oratorio by Heitor Villa-Lobos
- Villa-Lobos in June 1952
- English: Sumé, Father of Fathers: Amerindian Symphony with Chorus
- Catalogue: W511
- Occasion: 400th Anniversary of the founding of the City of São Paulo
- Text: "Beata Virgem" by Padre José de Anchieta
- Language: Portuguese; Latin; Tupi
- Composed: 1952 – 15 February 1953: Rio de Janeiro / New York
- Dedication: Mindinha
- Published: 1952: Paris
- Publisher: Max Eschig
- Duration: 67 min.
- Movements: 5
- Scoring: Orchestra, SATB chorus, tenor, baritone, and bass soloists

Premiere
- Date: 4 April 1957:
- Location: Salle Gaveau, Paris
- Conductor: Heitor Villa-Lobos
- Performers: Jean Giraudeau, Camille Maurane, Jacques Chalude; Orchestre Radio-Symphonique de Paris Choeur de la Radiodiffusion-Television Française

Symphony No. 10, subtitled Sumé pater patrium: Sinfonia ameríndia com coros, is an oratorio by the Brazilian composer Heitor Villa-Lobos, written in 1952–53. The broadcast performance of the world-premiere performance under the composer's direction lasts just over 67 minutes.

== History ==
Villa-Lobos composed his Tenth Symphony for the 400th anniversary of the founding of the city of São Paulo. He began work in Rio de Janeiro in 1952, completing the score on 15 February 1953 in New York.

It was first performed at the Théâtre des Champs-Élysées in Paris on 4 April 1957. The soloists were Jean Giraudeau (tenor), Camille Maurane (baritone), and Jacques Chalude (bass). The Orchestre National et Choeur de la Radiodiffusion Française was conducted by the composer. The score is dedicated to Mindinha (Arminda Neves d'Almeida), the composer's companion for the last 23 years of his life.

== Instrumentation ==
The symphony/oratorio is scored for tenor, baritone, and bass soloists, mixed choir, and an orchestra consisting of 2 piccolos, 2 flutes, 2 oboes, cor anglais, 3 clarinets, bass clarinet, 2 bassoons, contrabassoon, 4 horns, 4 trumpets, 4 trombones, tuba, percussion (timpani, tam-tam, cymbals, chocalho, coconut hulls, lion's roar, bells, gong, sleigh bells, small frame drum, bass drum, xylophone, and marimba), celesta, 2 harps, piano, organ, and strings.

== Analysis ==
The symphony has five movements:

1. Allegro: "A terra e os seres" (The Earth and Its Creatures)
2. Lento: "Grito de guerra" (War Cry)
3. Scherzo (Allegretto scherzando): "Iurupichuna"
4. Lento: "A voz da terra e a aparição de Anchieta" (The Voice of the Earth and the Appearance of Anchieta)
5. Poco allegro: Glory in Heaven, and Peace on Earth

The first movement is for the orchestra alone, and serves as an overture to the four remaining movements, which feature the vocal soloists and choirs. The movement is in sectional form, dominated by a principal melodic motif consisting of an upper-neighbour note figure followed by an upward leap. This motif is found in all five of the main sections of the movement, which are differentiated by tempo, key area (C, B♭, E, C, and C), instrumentation, rhythms, harmonies, and specific transformations of the main motif.

The second theme of the first of these sections is the only one not derived from the core motif. Quasi-tonal quartal harmonies are especially evident, but alternate with polychords in dense ostinato textures and more thinly orchestrated tonal passages. The fourth section, which is developmental, begins with an abrupt change of tempo and a short tonal fugato in the strings.

== Discography ==
Chronologically, in order of recording date.

- Villa-Lobos par Villa-Lobos: Concert du 04/04/1957. Jean Giraudeau, tenor; Camille Maurane, baritone; Jacques Chalude, bass; Chœur de la RTF; Orchestre Radio-Symphonique de Paris; Heitor Villa-Lobos, cond. Broadcast recording by the French Radio, made at the Salle Gaveau in Paris, on 4 April 1957. World premiere of the Symphony No. 10, preceded on an all-Villa-Lobos programme by performances of Erosão and Chôros No. 6. MP3 streaming audio. [Bry-sur-Marne]: Ina Musique(s), 2017.
- Villa-Lobos: Sinfonía No. 10 "Amerindia": Sumé pater patrium. Francisco Vas, tenor; Enrique Baquerizo, baritone; Santos Ariño, bass; Coral Universitat de Illes Balears (Joan Company, chorus master); Coral Reyes Bartlet (José Hijar Polo, chorus master); Coro de Cámera de Tenerife and Coro del Conservatorio Superior de Música de Tenerife (Carmen Cruz Simó, chorus master); Orquestra Sinfónica de Tenerife; Victor Pablo Pérez, cond. Recorded in the Paraninfo de la Universidad de La Laguna (Tenerife), Islas Canarias, Spain, December 1998. CD recording, 1 audio disc: digital, 4¾ in., stereo. Harmonia Mundi HMI 987041. Barcelona: Harmonia Mundi Ibérica, n.d.
- Heitor Villa-Lobos: Symphony No. 10 "Amerindia". Lothar Odinius, tenor; Henryk Böhm, baritone; Jürgen Linn, bass-baritone; Members of the Staatsopernchor Stuttgart; SWR Vokalensemble Stuttgart; Radio-Sinfonieorchester Stuttgart des SWR; Carl St. Clair, cond. Recorded in the Stadthalle Sindelfingen, 29 November – 10 December 1999. CD recording, 1 audio disc: digital, 4¾ in., stereo. CPO 999 786–2. Georgsmarienhütte: CPO, 2007.
- Heitor Villa-Lobos: Symphony No. 10 "Amerindia" Sumé Pater Patrium (Greatest Father of Fathers), Oratorio in Five Parts for Orchestra, Chorus and Soloists. World Premiere Recording. Carla Wood, mezzo-soprano; Carlo Scibelli, tenor; Nmon Ford-Livene, bass-baritone; Santa Barbara Choral Society (Jo Anne Wasserman, chorus master); UCSB Chamber Choir (Michel Marc Gervais, chorus master); Donald Brinegar Singers (Donald Brinegar, chorus master); Santa Barbara Symphony Orchestra; Gisèle Ben-Dor, cond. Recorded at Oxnard Center for the Performing Arts, Oxnard, California, January 2000. CD recording, 1 audio disc: digital, 4¾ in., stereo. Koch International Classics 3-7488-2 HI. Port Washington, NY: Koch International Classics, 2000.
- Villa-Lobos: Symphony No. 10 "Amerindia". Leonardo Neiva, baritone; Saulo Javan, bass; São Paulo Symphony Orchestra and Choir (Naomi Munakata, chorus master); Isaac Karabtchevsky, cond. Recorded in São Paulo after 2011. CD recording, 1 audio disc: digital, 4¾ in., stereo. Naxos 8.573243. [S.l.]: Naxos Rights US, Inc., 2014.
