= Symphony No. 5 (Milhaud) =

Symphony by Darius Milhaud

The Symphony No. 5, Op. 322, is a work for orchestra by French composer Darius Milhaud. The piece was written in 1953 on a commission from Italian Radio. This work is not to be confused with Milhaud's Chamber Symphony No. 5 for Ten Wind Instruments, op. 75 (1922).

Milhaud's Fifth Symphony has four movements and a total running time of about 32 minutes. The titles of the movements, as descriptive of their character as of tempo, are as follows:

1. Vif et cinglant (approx. 8'20")
2. Lent et tendre (approx. 14')
3. Clair et léger (approx. 3'30")
4. Alerte et rude (approx. 6'30")

This symphony is published by Heugel & Cie. Recordings of this symphony include a 1992 all-digital recording by Alun Francis and the Radio-Sinfonieorchester Basel, part of a boxed set of Milhaud's Symphonies No. 1–12 on CPO.
