= Sinfonía de Antígona =

Symphony by Carlos Chávez

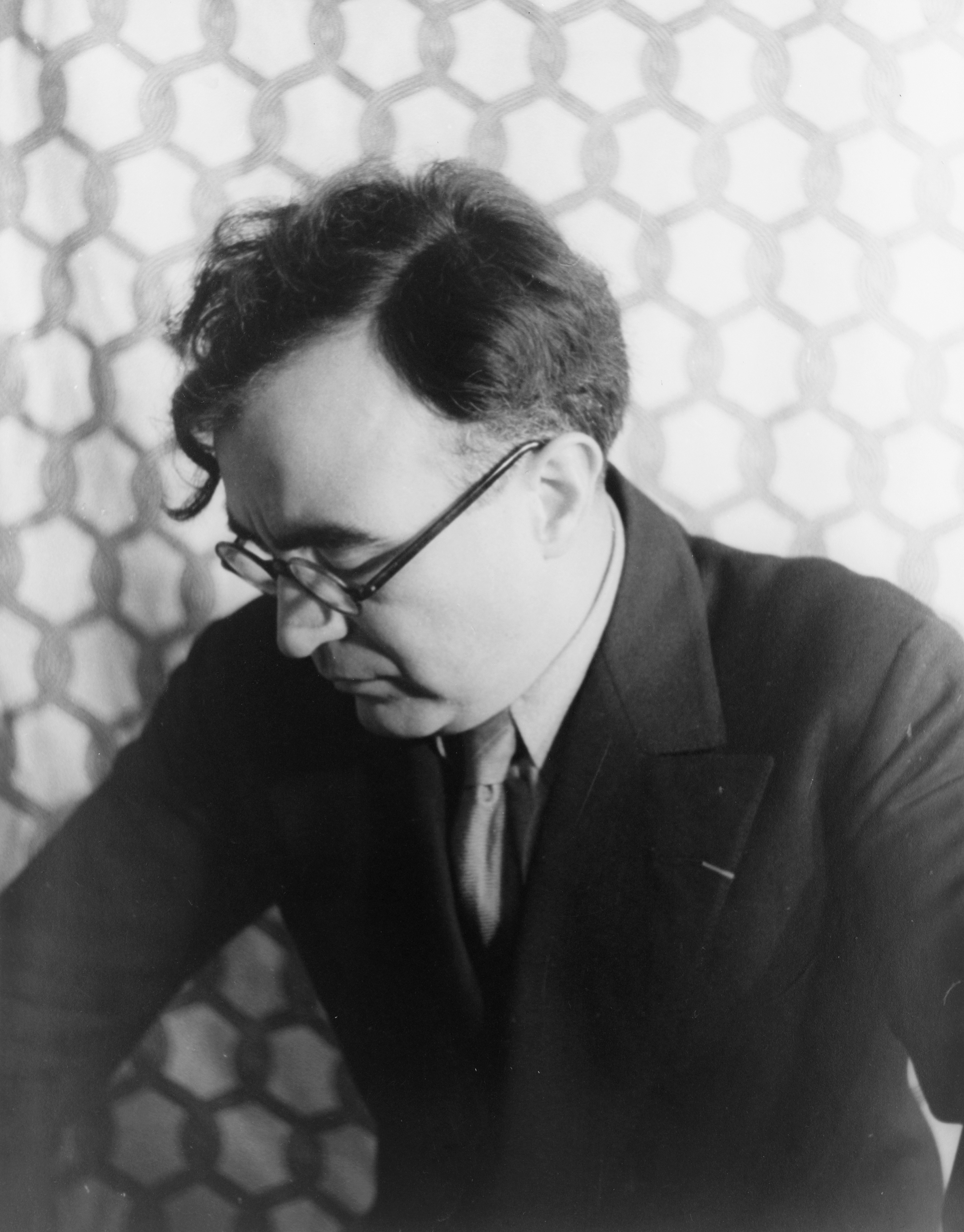
Carlos Chávez photographed by Carl Van Vechten (1937)

Sinfonía de Antígona (Antigone Symphony) is Carlos Chávez's Symphony No. 1, composed in 1933. The music originated as theatre music to accompany the tragedy of Antigone, hence the title of the symphony. The material was reworked into a single movement and rescored for a large orchestra. It lasts about 11 minutes in performance.

== History ==
The Sinfonía de Antígona originated from the incidental music Chávez composed for a production of Jean Cocteau's adaptation of Sophocles' tragedy Antigone, given by the group Teatro Orientación at the Palacio de Bellas Artes in Mexico City in 1932. Chávez re-shaped some of the musical materials and orchestrated the result as his First Symphony. It was premiered in Mexico City under the composer's baton on 15 December 1933. Two movements of the original theatre music, for a chamber ensemble of seven players, were eventually published by the composer's estate as Antígona, apuntes para la Sinfonía (Antigone, sketches for the Symphony).

== Instrumentation ==
The symphony is scored for piccolo, flute, alto flute, oboe, cor anglais, Heckelphone, E♭ clarinet, two clarinets, bass clarinet, three bassoons, eight horns, three trumpets, bass tuba, timpani, percussion (three players), two harps, and strings.

== Analysis ==
Chávez employs a modal language consciously borrowed from the Ancient Greek musical system, in particular the Greek Dorian and Hypodorian, including the Dorian chromatic genus. The obsessive use throughout the symphony of the two consecutive semitones of this genus creates a ritual atmosphere. The rhythms sometimes employ 5/8 time, taken from the ancient Greek paeonic (or cretic) meter. The harmonic idiom employed by Chávez in this symphony systematically avoids conventional triads, replacing them with quartal harmonies generated by superimposing fourths.

Although there are no programmatic references, the music's bleak and austere character reflects the drama for which it was originally created. The sparse orchestration contributes to the remote strangeness of the music through unusual unison and octave doublings, such as piccolo, clarinet, and trumpet; piccolo and Heckelphone; and oboe, clarinet, and Heckelphone.

== Discography ==
- Carlos Chávez: Sinfonía de Antígona, Sinfonía India; Dietrich Buxtehude (orch. Chávez): Chaconne in E minor. Orquesta Sinfónica de México; Carlos Chávez cond. 78-rpm set, 4 discs (monaural). Victor Musical Masterpiece Series. Victor Red Seal M 503 (manual sequence) and DM 503 (automatic sequence). Camden, NJ: Victor, 1938.
- Carlos Chávez: Sinfonía india, Sinfonía de Antígona, Sinfonía romántica. Stadium Symphony Orchestra, Carlos Chávez, cond. LP recording. Everest LPBR 6029 (monaural), SDBR 3029 (stereo). [Los Angeles]: Everest Records, 1959. Reissued on CD (with the orchestra named as New York Studium Symphony Orchestra), Philips Legendary Classics 422 305–2. [West Germany]: Philips Classics Ptoductions, 1989. Reissued on CD, Everest EVC-9041. New York: Everest Records, 1996. ["Stadium Symphony Orchestra" is the name taken by the New York Philharmonic Orchestra for its summer performances in the Lewisohn Stadium.]
- The Six Symphonies of Carlos Chávez. Orquesta Sinfónica Nacional de México; Carlos Chávez, cond. 3-LP set (stereo). CBS Masterworks 32 31 0002 (32 11 0020, 32 11 0022, 32 11 0024). New York: CBS, 1967.
- The Six Symphonies of Carlos Chávez. London Symphony Orchestra; Eduardo Mata, cond. 3-LP set (stereo). Vox Cum Laude 3D-VCL 9032. New York: Moss Music Group, 1983. Reissued on 2-CD set as Carlos Chávez: The Complete Symphonies. VoxBox2 CDX 5061. Hauppauge, NY: Moss Music Group, 1992. Partial reissue on CD: Carlos Chávez: Symphonies Nos. 1, 2 & 3. Vox Cum Laude MCD 10002. New York: Moss Music Group, 1983. This CD lso reissued as Vox Unique VU 9020. Hackensack, NJ: Vox Unique, 1990.
- Chávez: Sinfonía de Antígona, Symphony No. 4 Sinfonía romántica; Revueltas: Caminos, Música para charlar, Ventanas. Royal Philharmonic Orchestra (Chávez); Orquesta Filarmónica de la Ciudad de México (Revueltas); Enrique Bátiz, cond. CD recording (stereo). ASV Digital CD DCA 653. London: Academy Sound and Vision Ltd., 1989.
- Chavez: Chamber Works Vol 3. Includes Antígona, apuntes para la Sinfonía, Southwest Chamber Music (Beth Pflueger, piccolo; Stuart Horn, oboe; Valerie DiCarlo, cor anglais; Jim Foschia, clarinet; Tony Ellis, trumpet; Amy Wilkins, harp; Lynn Vartan and Jeff Olsen, percussion); Jeff von der Schmidt, cond. CD recording (stereo). Cambria 8852. Lomita, CA : Cambria Master Recordings, 2005.
