= La hija de Cólquide =

Ballet Score

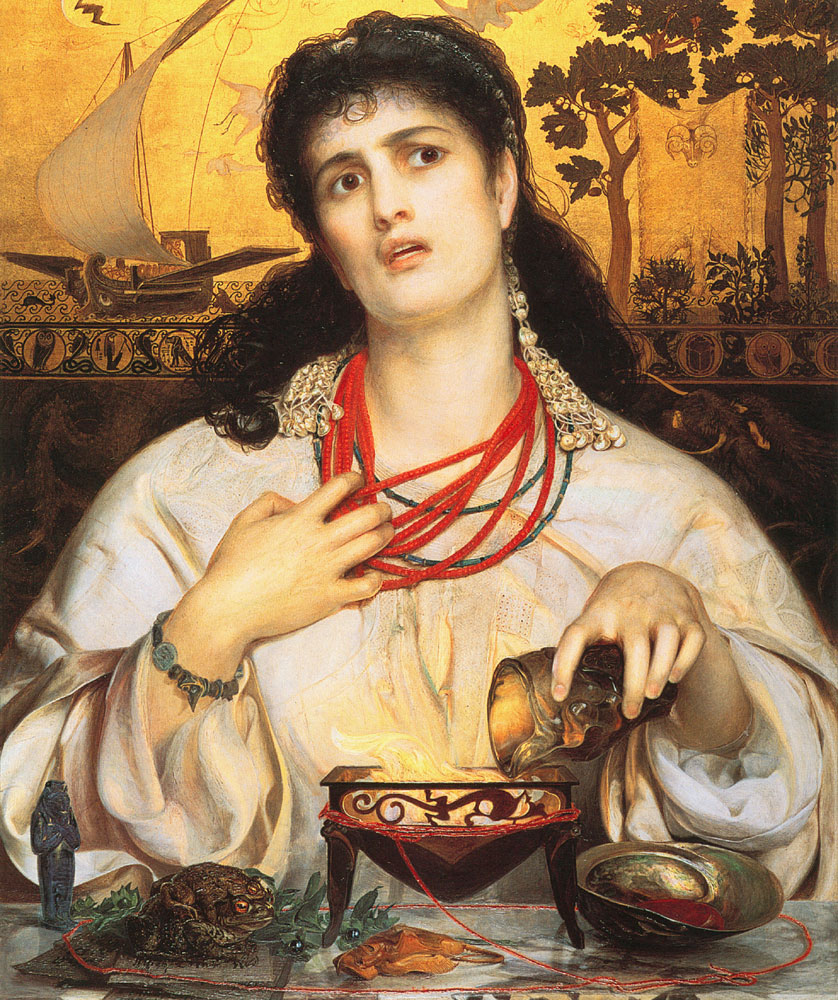
Medea, 1868 painting by Frederick Sandys

La hija de Cólquide (also known by the English translation, The Daughter of Colchis) is a ballet score composed by Carlos Chávez in 1943–44 on commission from the Elizabeth Sprague Coolidge Foundation for Martha Graham. The title refers to the mythological character Medea, daughter of King Aeëtes of Colchis, in the story of Jason and the Golden Fleece. The ballet spawned several subsidiary works in Chávez's catalog including his Third String Quartet. When Graham eventually choreographed it, she wrote a new scenario and gave it the title Dark Meadow.

== History ==
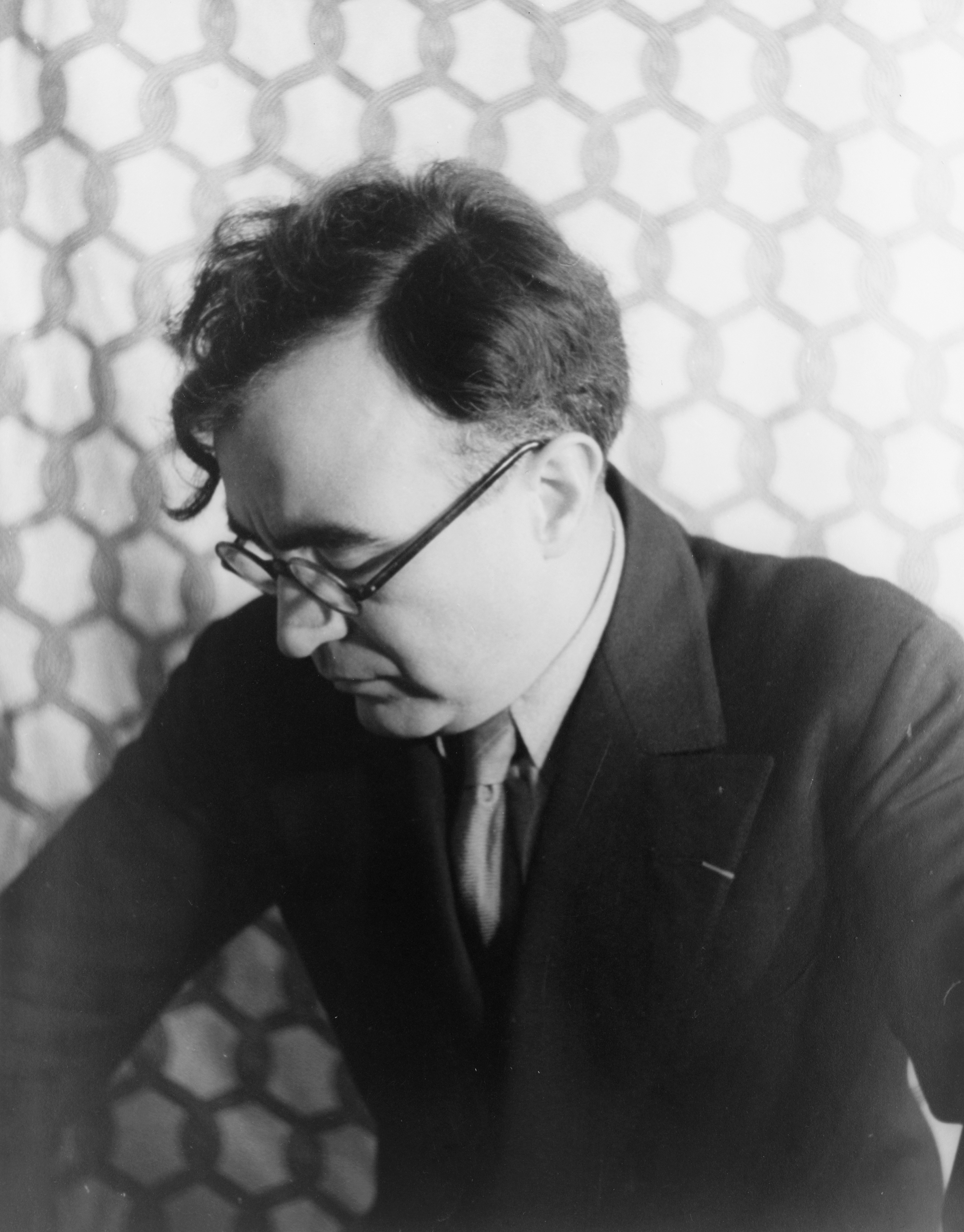
Carlos Chávez in 1937

The origin of La hija de Cólquide is closely intertwined with that of Aaron Copland's ballet Appalachian Spring and, to a lesser extent, with Samuel Barber's ballet, Medea.

In February 1941, Martha Graham offered a commission for a ballet to Copland, suggesting a "bitter, sardonic, murderous, and despairing" dance about Medea, the character from Greek mythology. She was only able to offer $100 in advance and $150 in royalties, and Copland declined the offer. A little more than a year later, in June 1942, Erick Hawkins, business manager and chief male dancer in Martha Graham's company (who later became her husband), approached Elizabeth Sprague Coolidge about commissioning new dance scores for the Graham company, initially suggesting Copland and Paul Hindemith. Coolidge consulted the head of the Music Division of the Library of Congress, Harold Spivacke, and with his encouragement, entered into negotiations with Hawkins. In July, before the commissions had actually been finalized, Graham sent Copland a new, more detailed version of her Medea scenarion, this time set in nineteenth-century New England and titled Daughter of Colchis. Copland disliked this concept, which he found "too severe", and suggested instead something more like Thornton Wilder's Our Town. Eventually, this would become Appalachian Spring but, in the meantime, it was decided to offer the second commission to Carlos Chávez rather than Hindemith.

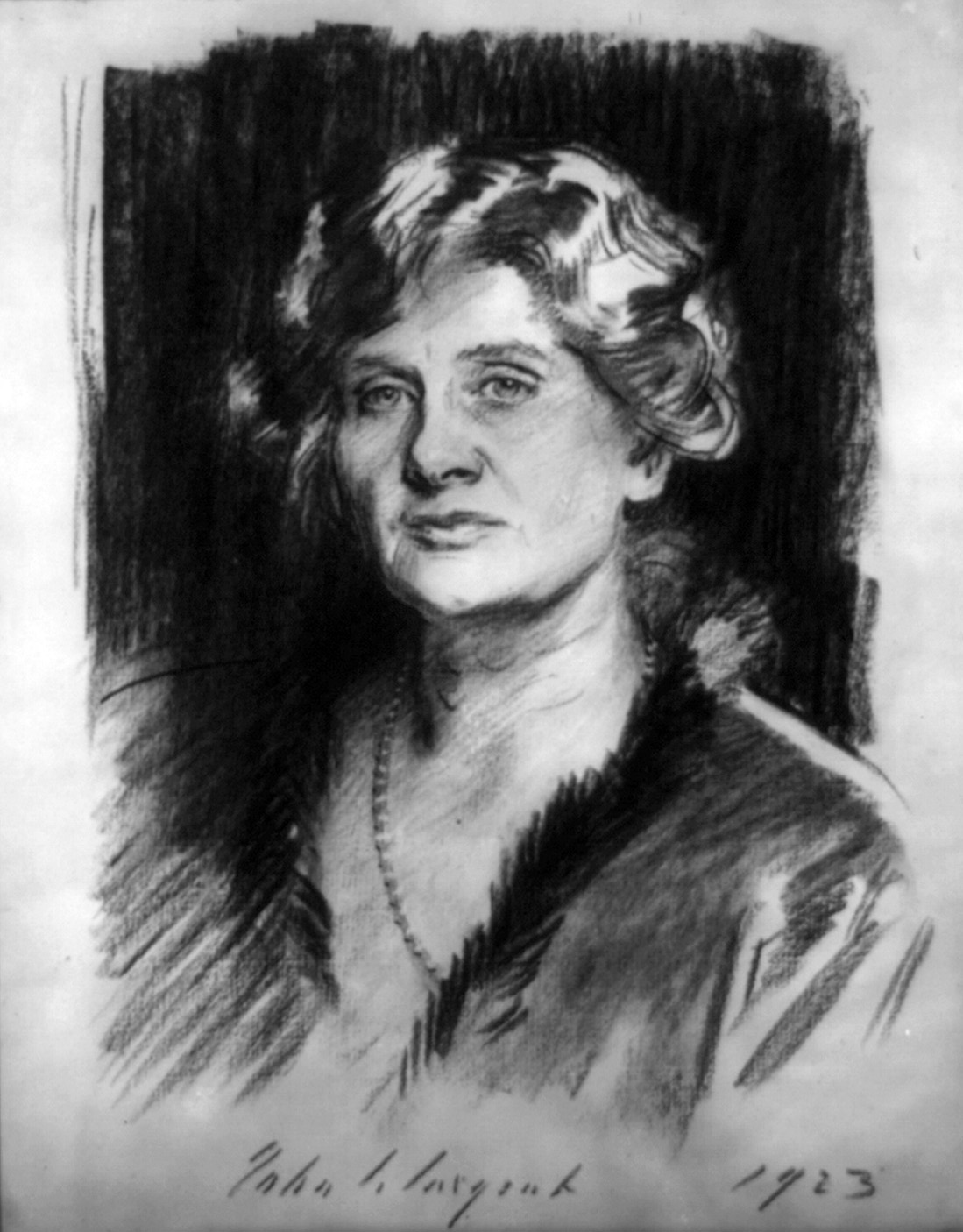
Elizabeth Sprague Coolidge

There are two conflicting accounts of the timeline of events surrounding the commission of Chávez's ballet, one from the point of view of the Americans, the other from the Mexican side. According to the former view, the commission was formally offered to Chávez in August 1942, but according to Chávez's biographer Roberto García Morillo, this did not occur until some time in 1943. The difference may have to do with a distinction between a preliminary exploration and a formal offer. A letter from Coolidge to Erick Hawkins dated 10 October 1942 states that Chávez had "accepted my tentative offer but who has, I think, not yet got into touch with Mr Spivacke and Martha", and in November according to Pollack, but not until later in 1943 according to García Morillo, Graham sent Chávez a version of the Daughter of Colchis scenario, only with the New England references removed, expressing fear that he might not like it. On the contrary, Chávez was enthusiastic about the scenario and readily agreed to use it. Copland and Chávez, who had been close friends since the 1920s, were very pleased by the idea of having their ballets premiered together—initially planned for the Berkshire Music Festival, in Pittsfield, Massachusetts, but then rescheduled for Coolidge's birthday, October 30, 1943, at the Library of Congress in Washington.

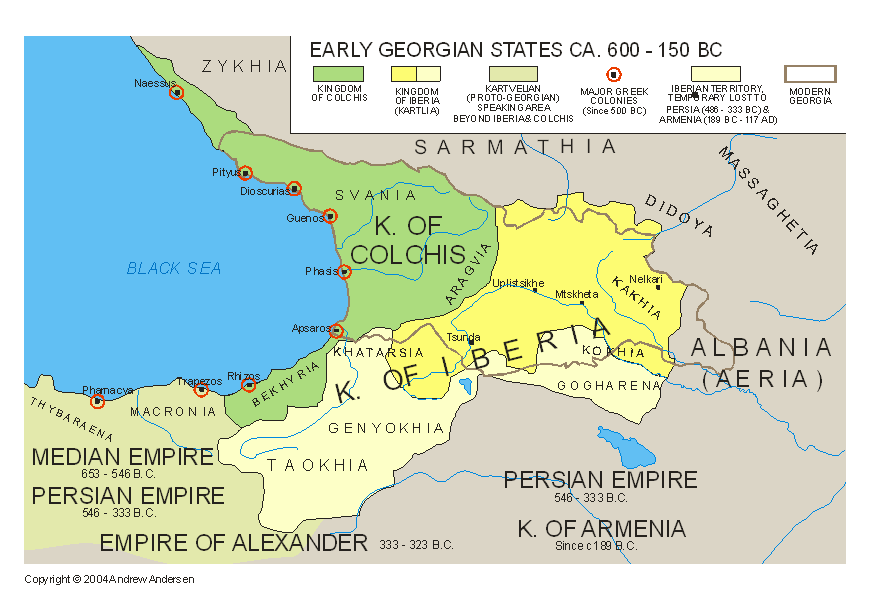
Map of Colchis

The original plan for the joint premiere of the Copland and Chávez ballets included an agreement that the scoring should be the same or very similar. In a letter from to Harold Spivacke dated 10 May 1943 Copland states that he means to stick as close as possible to Chávez's instrumentation of a double quartet, but another letter to Spivacke written a little less than a month later makes it clear that Copland still did not know exactly the instrumentation Chávez had in mind, even though the expected premiere was by then less than five months away: "I shall assume that the premiere date is October 30th unless I hear to the contrary. Please be sure to let me know if there is any change, as the more time I have the better. Also, if you can find out from Chavez what instruments he intends using, that would be a help." However, nothing yet had appeared from Chávez, and Copland was experiencing delays himself with other projects. In July, Graham wrote to Copland complaining that she still had received no word from Chávez, and on 21 July Copland wrote again to Spivacke, expressing hope that Chávez's score would arrive soon, "giving Martha something to work on until I am ready", but also inadvertently dropping his friend into hot water by carelessly saying, "As you probably know, he is famous for getting things done at the last possible moment", and suggesting a further postponement of the premiere until the Spring of 1944. A month later, Hawkins wrote that Graham had agreed it would be necessary to postpone the performance once again. Although they were aware of and could have accommodated Copland's delay, they had been counting on the arrival of Chávez's score, and were both "terribly disappointed" in him. When at last a token fragment of the score arrived in December, Spivacke apologetically sent it to Hawkins, worrying, "I can hardly imagine that Miss Graham will have enough even to start work on."

By the end of March 1944, Copland was nearing completion of Appalachian Spring, but wrote to Chávez expressing disappointment that he had not yet sent the completed score of Daughter of Colchis to Graham. Before another month had gone by, Graham took the decision to go ahead without Chávez. Copland wrote once again to his friend, explaining that Graham was still willing to go ahead with the project, but he "could not guarantee what Spivacke now wanted. I think the best thing would be if you clear up the situation directly with Spivacke", and offered to intercede with Spivacke when the score was finally completed. Appalachian Spring was scheduled for 30 December 1944, coupled with two other new ballets to newly commissioned scores, Imagined Wing to Darius Milhaud's Jeux du printemps and Hérodiade to a score of the same title by Paul Hindemith.

Although Graham herself followed through with the plan to choreograph Chávez's score, the combined events poisoned the composer's relationship with the Library of Congress and the Coolidge Foundation. In a letter to Martha Graham written in 1946, Harold Spivacke reported that "It is indeed unlikely that the Coolidge Foundation will ever again commission Chavez to write music for the dance or, in fact, for anything else which the date of performance is important."

Misfortune continued to plague Chávez's composition. One condition of the commission was that the manuscript score was to have been deposited in the Library of Congress. To ensure its safety in transit, late in 1944 the composer took it to the U.S. Embassy in Mexico City to have it sent in a diplomatic bag, but it never reached its destination. Fortunately, Chávez had made a photostat of the original manuscript from page 34, and a copy of the score up to that point had been made in ink by a copyist.

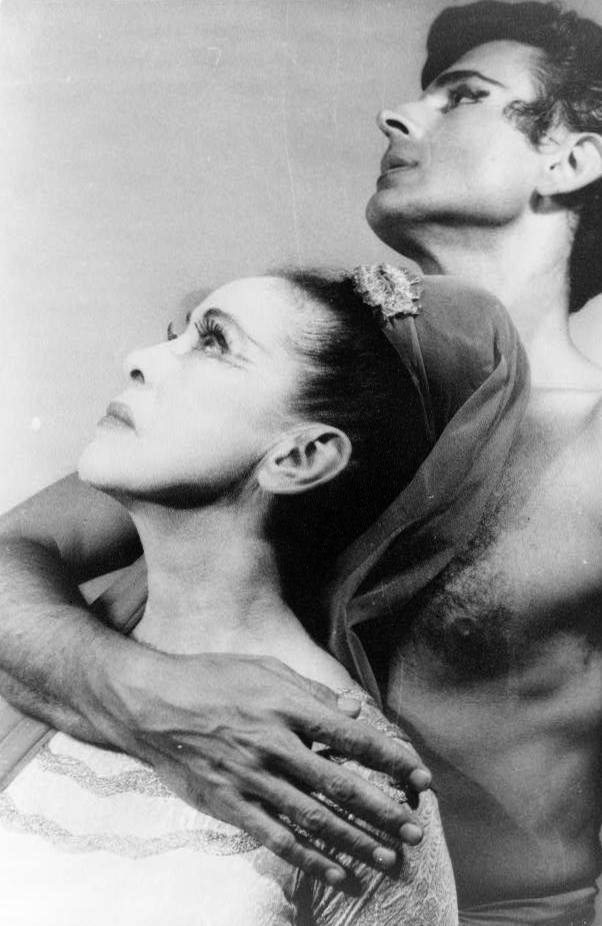
Martha Graham (with Bertram Ross), 1961

Through the efforts of Edward Waters, Assistant Chief of the Music Division of the Library of Congress, photostat copies of the score were finally sent to Graham in July 1945, in Bennington, Vermont, where she was teaching a summer course. In September, Graham wrote a letter to Spivacke expressing satisfaction with the music (especially the sections featuring the wind instruments), and enclosing a letter for Spivacke to forward to Chávez. However, both Graham and Spivacke were concerned about the lack of piano or percussion, which Chávez addressed firmly in his reply to Graham: "I would not like ever my music to be played in any other available instruments except as it has originally been written, for a double quartet. Also, a piano reduction is only to be used in rehearsals, but not for performances." Graham found the finished score insufficiently dramatic for Medea, and in any case was already committed to another Medea ballet, Cave of the Heart, with music by Samuel Barber. As a result, she decided to abandon the original scenario and create a completely new one, "about the mystery of rebirth and immortality which endures throughout human history, despite death and destruction". This new scenario, given the title Dark Meadow, is unique in Graham’s œuvre for its "nondramatic and intentionally esoteric qualities". The ballet was finally premiered in this form on 23 January 1946 at the Plymouth Theatre in New York, with sets designed by Isamu Noguchi, costumes by Edythe Gilfond, and lighting by Jean Rosenthal. The musicians were conducted by Louis Horst, and the principal roles were danced by Martha Graham as One Who Seeks, May O'Donnell as She of the Ground, and Erick Hawkins as He Who Summons. Graham regarded the production highly enough to revive it, first on 3 May 1947 and again in 1965 (in Israel), 1968, 1976, and 1977. Further revivals have been made since Graham's death, in 1994, 1999, 2003, 2011, 2012, and 2015.

== Musical form ==
The nine sections of the music are:

1. Preludio (oboe solo; oboe/bassoon;flute/oboe/bassoon; clarinet/bassoon; wind quartet)
2. Allegro (strings)
3. Lento (strings)
4. Allegro (strings)
5. Interludio (cello/viola/bassoon;bassoon/flute/clarinet;flute/oboe/clarinet)
6. Encantamiento (wind quartet; clarinet/bassoon; oboe/clarinet/bassoon; wind quartet; string quartet/flute/oboe/clarinet)
7. Zarabanda (string quartet)
8. Peán (oboe/string quartet; oboe/bassoon/viola/cello; clarinet/ bassoon/strings; oboe/clarinet/bassoon/strings; full double quartet)
9. Postludio (oboe solo/violin)

Chávez's score is constructed following Graham's original scenario, combining elements of Greek mythology with modern conceptions of psychological drama and mixing imagery of classical Greece and the nineteenth century of Edgar Allan Poe. There are four principal characters: The Man (poet, dreamer, the masculine free spirit), The Woman (the eponymous daughter of Colchis, Medea), The Muse (the Man's dream, an aspect of his soul, who guides him), and The Fury (the sinister aspect of the Woman) (programme note by Francisco Agea).

Most of the thematic material of the Preludio, which is for the winds only, recurs in the later movements of the ballet. There are four main themes: (1) an unaccompanied soliloquy for the solo oboe, (2) a moderato rising-and-falling scale figure, (3) an angular, meno mosso theme, and (4) an andantino theme, built from a three-note descending motive.

The Allegro, for the strings alone, opens with a stately motive which is developed in both strict and free iterations in different modes, followed by a middle section featuring furious triplets running over the already established duplets. The opening material then returns to conclude the movement.

The Lento, also for the string quartet, begins with a modified version of the main theme of the preceding movement, now in the Aeolian mode, presented initially by the viola and answered by the other three instruments. This is followed by a new motive, taken from the Preludio.

Chávez described the Allegro as a type of fugue, because of the use of various fugal developmental procedures such as augmentation, diminution, and fragmentation. Chávez greatly expanded this movement for use as the finale of his String Quartet No. 3.

Although the viola and cello suggest at the outset of the Interludio that the strings will continue to predominate, a low bassoon solo leads to an extended homophonic passage for the wind quartet. The melodic substance of this passage will be inverted to become the main subject of the following Encantamiento.

The Encantamiento represents the transformation of the Daughter of Colchis into a witch. Musically, it is largely based on the three-note motive from the end of the Preludio, accompanied by syncopated staccato figures, sustained bass pedals, and quiet motoric rhythms. This texture gives way at the end to rapid ascending scales and arpeggios that recall similar passages from Stravinsky.

The Zarabanda is given to the string quartet alone. A slow, majestic and serene theme, derived from the main subject of the Encantamiento, alternates with a livelier, whirling, ternary theme of more rhythmic weight, consisting of an endless succession of quarter notes and eighth notes, which produces a more lively motion than is usual in a saraband. According to the composer, this movement is an homage to Carl B. Engel, musicologist, a director of the Musical Quarterly, president of the publishing firm G. Schirmer, and chief of the Music Division of the Library of Congress, who died in 1944. His initials are symbolized by the three-note opening motive, C–B–E.

The Peán is the most severe and desolate movement, representing the Woman's struggle for understanding and humanity. It is cast in a five-part rondo form: ABA′B′A″. The first, melancholy and expressive theme is given to the oboe, accompanied in the bassoon by a modified version of the main theme from the Encantamiento. The secondary, B theme is derived from the preludio, and the climax of the movement is reached in its second occurrence It is only with this funereal chant that the full ensemble of eight instruments sounds together for the first time.

The Postludio resolves the conflicts of the characters, returning to the tranquility of the Preludio. Formally, it is a compressed recapitulation of the opening movement, with the material in reverse order.

Chávez derived four works from the nine movements of the ballet:

- Suite, for double quartet, from La hija de Cólquide, for flute, oboe, clarinet, bassoon, two violins, viola, and cello (1946: nos. 1, 5, 6, 7, 8, and 9 from the ballet)
- String Quartet No. 3 (1946: movements 2, 3, and 4 from the ballet, with the last movement greatly expanded)
- La hija de Cólquide, symphonic suite from the ballet, for orchestra (1947: five movements, adapted from nos. 1, 6, 7, 8, and 9)
- Saraband, for string orchestra (movement 7 of the ballet)

== Dark Meadow ==
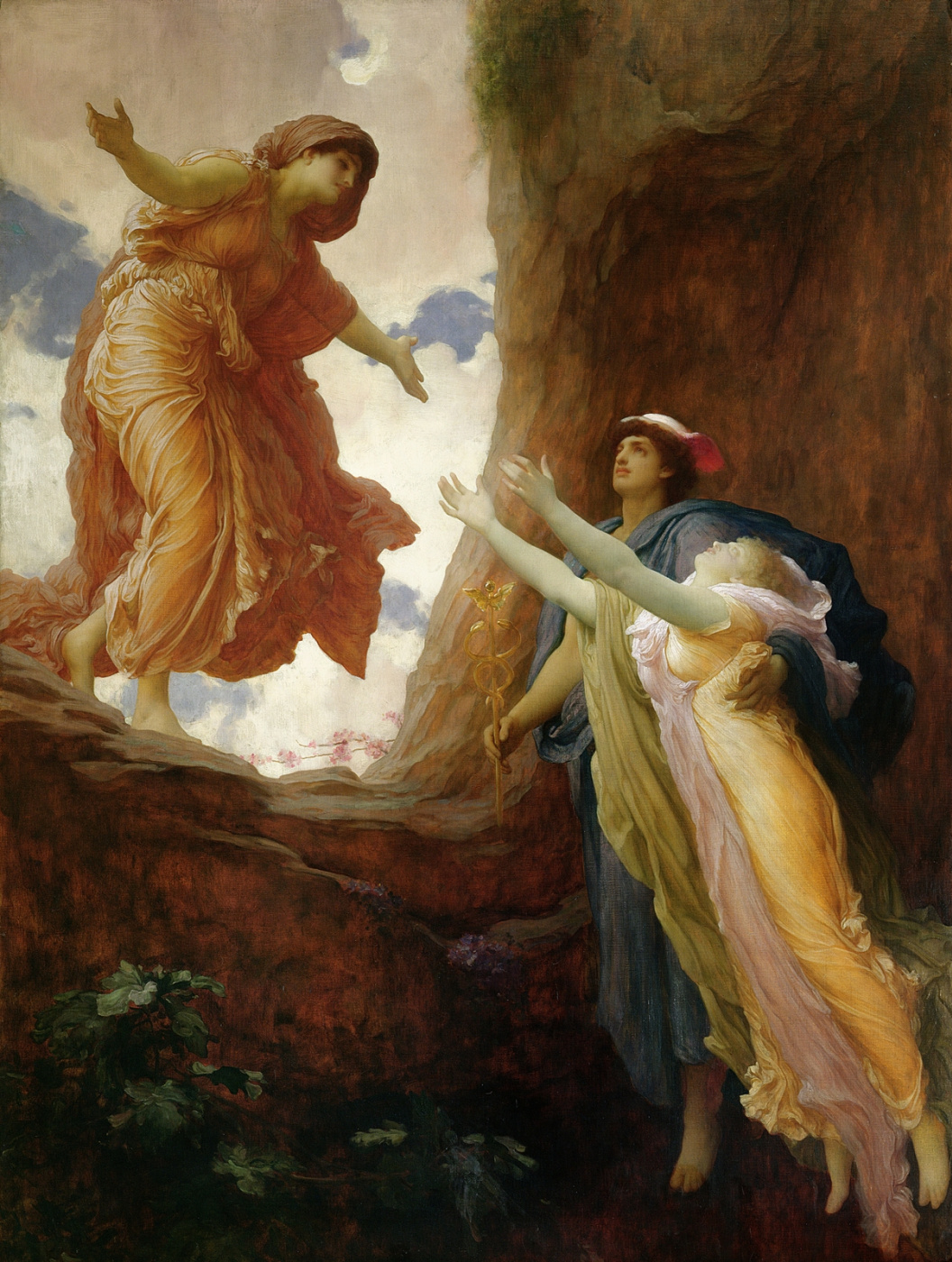
The Return of Persephone (1891), by Frederic Leighton

Graham's dance scenario falls into four sections:

1. Remembrance of Ancestral Footsteps
2. Terror of Loss
3. Ceaselessness of Love
4. Recurring Ecstacy of the Flowering Branch

Noguchi's set reflects the four-part structure by featuring four stones or phallic herms in a desert landscape, while smaller, symbolic props are often brought onstage by She of the Ground, who also turns the set pieces to signal changes in the action.

The writings of Carl Jung strongly influenced Graham's enigmatic conception, which links one of her most consistent themes—an artist-seeker entering a dark place and undergoing an ordeal, as a result of which she is reborn and enlightened—with the ancient Greek myth of Persephone, in which a woman's changing passions correspond to the changing of the four seasons. Within this framework, the heroine (One Who Seeks) is instructed by an earth mother (She of the Ground), and a personification of the male (He Who Summons). A dance chorus of five women and either three or four men, or of five men and four women (They Who Dance Together) strike archaic poses and stamp primitive dances, perform unison erotic (and yet formal and angular) duets, connecting fertility rites to human sexuality. The second section is a solo dance for One Who Seeks, in which she first walks upon and then winds herself in a long piece of dark fabric. In In "Ceaselessness of Love", He Who Summons pursues her and they dance a duet.

== Discography ==
No recording of the complete ballet has been published.

=== Double quartet ===
- Carlos Chávez: Chamber Works. Xochipilli: An Imagined Aztec Music; Suite for Double Quartet, from The Daughter of Colchis; Tambuco; Energía; Toccata for Percussion Instruments. La Camerata; Tambuco; Eduardo Mata (cond.). CD recording, 1 disc: stereo, 12 cm. Dorian DOR-90215. Troy, NY: Dorian Records, 1994.
- Carlos Chávez: Complete Chamber Music, Vol. 1. Invention I for piano; Invention II for string trio; Invention III for harp; Suite for Double Quartet; Upingos. Southwest Chamber Music. CD recording, 1 disc: stereo, 12 cm. Cambria CD 8850. Lomita, CA: Cambria Master Recordings, 2003.

=== String Quartet No. 3 ===
- Chávez: Cuarteto Latinoamericano: La obra completa para cuerda de Carlos Chávez. Saul Bitrán, Áron Bitrán, violins; Javier Montiel, viola; Álvaro Bitrán, violoncello; Victor Flores, contrabass. Recorded in May 2003 in the Sala Nezahualcóyotl of the Centro Cultural Universitario. CD recording, 1 disc: stereo, 12 cm. Urtext Digital Classics JBCC 109. México: Urtext S. A. de C. V., 2005.
- Carlos Chávez: Complete Chamber Music, Vol. 4. String Quartets Nos. 1–3; Sonatina for Piano; Sonatina for Violin and Piano; Sonatina for Violoncello and Piano; Sextet for Piano and Strings; Three Pieces for Guitar; Three Spirals for Violin and Piano; Fuga H-A-G-C; Variations for Violin and Piano; Feuille d'Album for Guitar; Trio for Flute, Viola, and Harp. Southwest Chamber Music. CD recording, 2 discs: stereo, 12 cm. Cambria CD 8853A/B. Lomita, CA: Cambria Master Recordings, 2006.

=== Symphonic Suite ===
- Chávez: Suite from La hija de Cólquide. 3-disc 78 rpm set Anfión AM 4. México: Anfión, 1947. Reissued 1951 a 10-inch mono LP was issued (Decca Gold Label DL 7512. Reissued 1978 by Varèse Sarabande on side 2 of 12-inch LP).
- Música Méxicana Vol. 7: Chávez: Cantos de México, Toccata for Orchestra, Paisajes mexicanos, La hija de Cólquide, Baile (Cuadro sinfónico) [the original fourth movement of Symphony No. 4]. Claudia Coonce, oboe; The State of Mexico Symphony Orchestra; Enrique Bátiz, cond. CD recording (stereo). ASV Digital CD DCA 927. London: Academy Sound and Vision Ltd., 1995
- Jiménez Mabarak & Carlos Chávez. Orquesta Filarmonica. Clásicos Mexicanos / Prodisc 21022.
- Carlos Jimenez Mabarak & Carlos Chávez. Clásicos Mexicanos 22102.
- Chávez: Symphony No. 2; Hija de Cólquide. Spartacus 21022.

=== Saraband for strings ===
- Latin American Classics Vol. 1. With works by Silvestre Revueltas, Juventino Rosas, José P. Moncayo García, and Manuel Ponce. Festival Orchestra of Mexico; Enrique Bátiz, cond. CD recording. Naxos 8550838. [Hong Kong]: Naxos, 1994.
