= Milton Preves =

Milton Preves (June 18, 1909, in Cleveland, Ohio – June 11, 2000, in Glenview, Illinois) was a violist, conductor and pedagogue. He was a member of the Chicago Symphony Orchestra for 52 years, of which 47 years were as principal violist.

Preves attended the University of Chicago. In 1931, he joined the Little Symphony — a Chicago Symphony training ground—and was promoted to the Chicago Symphony Orchestra in 1934. He became principal violist in 1939, which position he held until he retired from the Chicago Symphony Orchestra in 1986. He played under the batons of all the Chicago Symphony's conductors, up until Sir Georg Solti, except for the Chicago Symphony's founder, Theodore Thomas.

Preves was a founding member of the Chicago String Quartet, as well as the music director for Chicago's North Side Symphony for 26 years. Besides playing the viola, he was a conductor with the Oak Park-River Forest, Wheaton, and Gary symphonies, as well as the Gold Coast Chamber Orchestra. He was also a part of the music faculty at a number of universities: Chicago Musical College, Northwestern University, and DePaul University.

In 1963, he resigned as conductor of the Oak Park-River Forest orchestra, because Carol Anderson, a talented black female violinist whom Preves had recruited for the symphony, was pressured to resign because of her race. The president of the orchestra quickly apologized and urged Preves to continue to conduct the group. He did not return for 25 years and when he did, it was only to play as a soloist with the orchestra.

Ernest Bloch dedicated his Meditation and Processional to Milton Preves. Preves taught many students, some of whom continue to teach, passing down his style.
