= Symphony No. 5 (Chávez) =

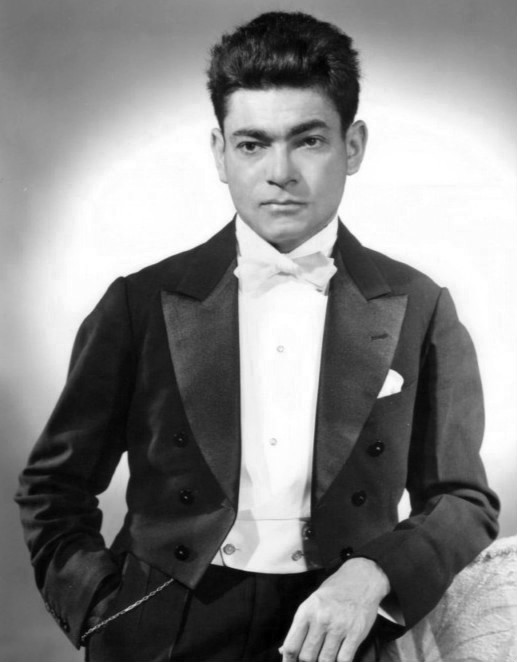
Izler Solomon (in 1948), who made the first recording of Chávez's Fifth Symphony

Symphony No. 5, also called Sinfonía para cuerdas (Symphony for Strings) is a composition for string orchestra by Carlos Chávez, composed in 1953.

The Fifth Symphony was commissioned on 24 September 1952 by the Koussevitzky Music Foundation, and was sketched in July and August 1953. Chávez composed all of it during the month of September, while he was living in Acapulco, completing the fair copy of the score the following month. The score is dedicated to the memory of Serge and Natalie Koussevitsky.

It was premiered in Royce Hall, Los Angeles, by the Los Angeles Chamber Orchestra, conducted by the composer, on either 1 December or 10 December 1953.

== Music ==
The work is scored for a conventional string orchestra of violins I and II, violas, cellos, and double basses.

The Symphony is in three movements:

1. Allegro molto moderato
2. Molto lento
3. Allegro con brio

In contrast to the Romantic character of the Fourth Symphony, Chávez here adopts a neoclassical orientation. This is especially pronounced in the last movement, whose contrapuntal textures lend it a decidedly baroque character. The first movement is in 12/8 time and in a sort of E minor tonality. The style of the movement resembles the opening of the Allegro of the Third Symphony, though of course without the powerful effect of a large orchestra.

== Discography ==
- Carlos Chávez, Sinfonía No. 5 for String Orchestra; Paul Ben-Haim: Concerto for Strings, Op 40. The M-G-M String Orchestra; Izler Solomon, cond. LP recording (monaural). MGM E 3423. Los Angeles: MGM Records (a division of Metro-Goldwyn-Mayer, Inc.), [1957].
- The Six Symphonies of Carlos Chávez . Orquesta Sinfónica Nacional de México; Carlos Chávez, cond. 3-LP set (stereo). CBS Masterworks 32 31 0002 (32 11 0020, 32 11 0022, 32 11 0024). New York: CBS, 1967.
- The Six Symphonies of Carlos Chávez. London Symphony Orchestra; Eduardo Mata, cond. 3-LP set (stereo). Vox Cum Laude 3D-VCL 9032. New York: Moss Music Group, 1983. Reissued on 2-CD set as Carlos Chávez: The Complete Symphonies. VoxBox2 CDX 5061. Hauppauge, NY: Moss Music Group, 1992.
- Blas Galindo, Sones de Mariachi; Silvestre Revueltas, Sensemayá; José Pablo Moncayo, Amatzinac; Salvador Contreras, Corridos; Carlos Chávez: Symphony No. 5. Orquesta Sinfónica Nacional de México; Coro Nacional de México; Enrique Arturo Diemecke, cond. Elena Durán, flute; María Luisa Tamez, soprano. CD recording, 1 sound disc: digital, stereo, 4¾ in. Sony Classical CDEC 471000. [Mexico City]: Sony Music Entertainment Mexico, 1994.
