= Warriors of Virtue =

1997 film by Ronny Yu

- Theatrical release poster
- Directed by: Ronny Yu
- Screenplay by: Michael Vickerman; Hugh Kelley
- Based on: Characters by Dennis K. Law; Ron Law; Christopher Law; Jeremy Law
- Produced by: Ronald Law; Dennis K. Law; Christopher Law; Jeremy Law; Patricia Ruben; Lyle Howry; Yoram Barzlial
- Starring: Angus Macfadyen; Mario Yedidia; Marley Shelton
- Cinematography: Peter Pau
- Edited by: David Wu
- Music by: Don Davis
- Production companies: Metro-Goldwyn-Mayer Pictures; China Film Co-Production Corporation; Law Brothers Entertainment
- Distributed by: MGM Distribution Co.
- Release date: May 2, 1997
- Running time: 101 minutes
- Countries: United States; China
- Language: English
- Budget: $56 million
- Box office: $6 million

Warriors of Virtue is a 1997 martial arts fantasy film directed by Hong Kong filmmaker Ronny Yu in his American English-language directorial debut, written by Michael Vickerman and Hugh Kelley, and starring Angus Macfadyen, Mario Yedidia, and Marley Shelton. The film was an international co-production between the United States, China, Hong Kong, and Canada and was based on a series of characters created by the Chinese-American Law brothers, four siblings who worked as physicians and had no prior filmmaking experience. The story follows a young boy who stumbles into a mystical world based on the Tao Te Ching where he meets the titular Warriors of Virtue—anthropomorphic kangaroos who wield the powers of Tao and battle an evil warlord. The Irish band Clannad provided the original song "Forces of Nature".

The film was a critical and commercial failure. It was followed by a direct-to-video sequel, Warriors of Virtue: The Return to Tao, in 2002.

== Plot ==
Middle school student Ryan Jeffers suffers a disability to his leg, preventing him from trying out for sports and fitting in. He is currently the waterboy of his school's football team and has a crush on quarterback Brad's girlfriend Tracy. He often seeks escape through comic books and dreams of adventure, hiding the depression of his disability from his mother.

One day, the owner of his favorite restaurant, his friend Ming, gives him a manuscript of Tao representing the five elements: Earth, Fire, Water, Wood, and Metal. He advises Ryan to live his life no matter his physical limits.

That night, Ryan and his best friend Chucky are approached by Brad and his friends, who suggest an initiation for their group. Leading them to a water plant, Ryan is told he needs to cross a narrow pipe to sign his name on a wall of graffiti. Ignoring Chucky's protests, Ryan attempts to cross, but a spillage pipe opens and knocks Ryan into the water.

Ryan wakes in a strange forest and is attacked by assailants drawn off by a creature from the lake. As he escapes, he realizes his leg works. He meets a dwarf-like man named Mudlap before a beautiful girl named Elysia drives him off. She tells Ryan that he is in Tao. Ryan tells her about the manuscript, which had been lost in his backpack. Believing it to be the Manuscript of Legend, Elysia takes Ryan to Master Chung, and he meets four of the five Warriors of Virtue, anthropomorphic kangaroos each representing an element: Lai, Warrior of Wood; Chi, Warrior of Fire; Tsun, Warrior of Earth; and Yee, Warrior of Metal. He is told that Yun, the Warrior of Water, and their leader, had left them following an earlier conflict and that the manuscript would be sought by Komodo, a warlord who betrayed the Warriors and is stealing from the Lifesprings of Tao to stay young forever. Ryan is captured by Komodo's henchmen Mantose, Barbarocious, and Dullard, but is saved by Yun. Ryan convinces Yun to return to the Lifespring.

Ryan flees, wanting to return home, but Mudlap leads him into General Grillo's arms, and Chung saves him. Yun, Yee, and Chi go after the manuscript and fall into a trap after being betrayed by Elysia, who joins Komodo in an act of vengeance against Yun for killing her brother by accident. They are nearly killed in a trap but narrowly escape using their skills, and they return to the Lifespring to prevent Komodo from ambushing the others. Komodo fights Chung and ultimately kills him, then makes off with Ryan.

When Ryan awakens at Komodo's palace, Elysia begs him to read from the book so that Komodo can invade his world for more Lifesprings. Ryan realizes he can't read the book which upsets Komodo, who tries to strike him down. Elysia interferes and is struck down by Barbarocious. Komodo kills Barbarocious in rage as Ryan escapes.

Komodo returns to the Lifespring and challenges the Warriors to one-on-one combat, splitting into five versions of himself. He taunts and defeats the warriors while Ryan, after getting an apology from Mudlap for his betrayal, finds an inscription in the manuscript. Ryan tricks Komodo into overusing his power, weakening him so the warriors can purify his spirit, reforming him into a kind man, and purifying his army. Ryan, mortally wounded, is surrounded by his friends, and Yee astonishes his comrades by thanking Ryan, speaking for the first time in years.

Suddenly, Ryan is back at the water plant before crossing the pipe. Realizing his desperation to fit in led to his accident, this time, he refuses to cross it. The spillage pipe opens like before and breaks the narrow crossing pipe, trapping Brad on the other side. His insults to his friends only prompt them to leave him behind for the police to find. That night, Ryan apologizes to his mother for an earlier argument. When he goes to bed, he offers to tell his dog Bravo about Tao.

== Cast ==
- Mario Yedidia as Ryan Jeffers, a young boy with a disabled leg.
- Angus Macfadyen as Komodo, an evil warlord and sorcerer that seeks to conquer Tao and then Earth.
- Marley Shelton as Elysia, a young woman who lives in Tao.
- Chao-Li Chi as Master Chung, the master of the Warriors
- Michael J. Anderson as Mudlap, a dwarf-like creature.
- Tom Towles as General Grillo, one of Komodo's henchmen.
- Lee Arenberg as Mantose, one of Komodo's henchmen.
- Dennis Dun as Ming, the owner of Ryan's favorite restaurant.
- Don W. Lewis as Mayor Keena, the mayor of the village where Master Chung lives.
- Teryl Rothery as Kathryn Jeffers, Ryan's mom.
- Rickey D'Shon Collins as Chucky, Ryan's best friend.
- Michael Dubrow as Brad, a quarterback at Ryan's school.
- Julie Patzwald as Tracy, the girlfriend of Brad
- Ying Qu as Barbarotious, a female follower of Komodo.
- Stuart Kingston as Dullard, one of Komodo's henchmen.
- Gill Butler and Victoria Schoenke as Villagers.
- Michael Vickerman as Dragoon Commander, a full-armored minion of Komodo that leads his Dragoons.
- Adam Mills as Toby
- Warren Moon as Football coach

=== In-suit performers ===
- Jack Tate as Yun, the Warrior of Water and Virtue of Benevolence, and the leader of the Warriors of Virtue
- Doug Jones as Yee, the Warrior of Metal and Virtue of Righteousness, who hasn't spoken a word in years
- Don W. Lewis as Lai, the Warrior of Wood and Virtue of Order
- J. Todd Adams as Chi, the Warrior of Fire and Virtue of Wisdom
- Adrienne Corcoran as Tsun, the Warrior of Earth and Virtue of Loyalty
- Roy Cebellos as Willy Beest, a humanoid cape buffalo.
- Jason Hamer as Mosely, a humanoid rhinoceros.

=== Voices ===
- Mina E. Mina as Master Chung
- Scott McNeil as Yun
- Doug Parker as:
  - Yee
  - Chi
- Dale Wilson as Lai
- Kathleen Barr as Tsun
- Jay Brazeau as Willy Beest
- Garry Chalk as Mosely
- Ian James Corlett as Mayor Keena
- Venus Terzo as Barbarotious
- Drew Reichelt as Dullard
- Colin Murdock as Dragoon Commander
- Ward Perry as Villager
- Shane Meier as Toby

== Production ==
Warriors cost $56 million to produce. The film's producers, Chinese American brothers Ron, Dennis, Christopher and Jeremy Law, were surgeons by trade and had never produced a film before. Their father, Joseph Law, was a wealthy toy manufacturer in China, who put up most of the reported $36 million shooting budget, though reportedly other investors were also involved. MGM distributed the film and sank a reported $20 million on prints and advertising. Dennis Law stated the intention with the film was to develop a novel action adventure film different from not only comparable releases, but would also lend itself to launching a new line of action figures and associated merchandising. Dennis Law further stated that their grandfather had named each of the Law brothers after one of the Five Classic Virtues which served as the impetus for what would become Warriors of Virtue. Kangaroos were chosen as the design for the titular Warriors due to their bipedal nature as well as their inherent abilities of punches and kicks translating best to the film's planned incorporation of the style of Hong Kong action cinema as well as the Law brothers feeling that no quadrupedal creature would adequately translate in such a way it would be believable to see them perform the martial arts sequences for which the film required.

=== Filming ===
The movie began shooting January 15, 1996 and completed shooting May 9, 1996. The 8 animatronic kangaroos used to bring to life the titular Warriors were designed and created by Tony Gardner. Gardner spent the first half of 1996 in China, working on shots for the film and creating seven animatronic characters. “When I came back, I realized the problem of ‘disappearing’ like that for a long time: People in the industry tend to forget who you are. But in talking to people, to remind them what we did, I thought: There’s no reason we couldn’t do all a film’s visual effects work under one roof.”

=== Effects ===
The costumes for the creatures, the makeup, and the animatronic character effects were provided by Tony Gardner and his company Alterian, Inc.

== Reception ==
Warriors of Virtue received negative reviews from critics. Film critic Kale Klein of the Carlsbad Current-Argus was so physically distressed by the film that he actually vomited during the initial screenings. On an episode of Siskel and Ebert, Gene Siskel voted thumbs down and described Warriors of Virtue as "Generic junk made for the international action market, a cheap hybrid of Power Rangers and Ninja Turtles." Roger Ebert also voted thumbs down, however he praised the set design by Eugenio Zanetti and said in his review "he made a great setting for a stupid story". Wade Major of Boxoffice Magazine thought it "could be the most impressive Hollywood debut yet for a Hong Kong director, although lackluster writing and a needlessly muddled storyline somewhat tarnish the effort." On the review aggregator website Rotten Tomatoes, 18% of 11 critics' reviews are positive.

=== Home video reception ===
The film did not do much better when it hit video, earning $7.69 million from the date of its release in September 1997 through mid-December of that year.

== Other media ==
=== Toys ===
A line of action figures based on the film was manufactured and released by Play 'Em LLC.

== Sequel ==
A second film titled Warriors of Virtue: The Return to Tao was released on October 22, 2002. It was directed by the first film's co-writer Michael Vickerman with Nathan Phillips replacing Yedidia as Ryan Jeffers along with Nina Liu as Amythis, Shedrack Anderson III as Chucky and Kevin Smith (his final role) as Dogon, a villain bent on taking over our world and Tao.
