= Caballos de vapor =

1926–1932 ballet score by Carlos Chávez

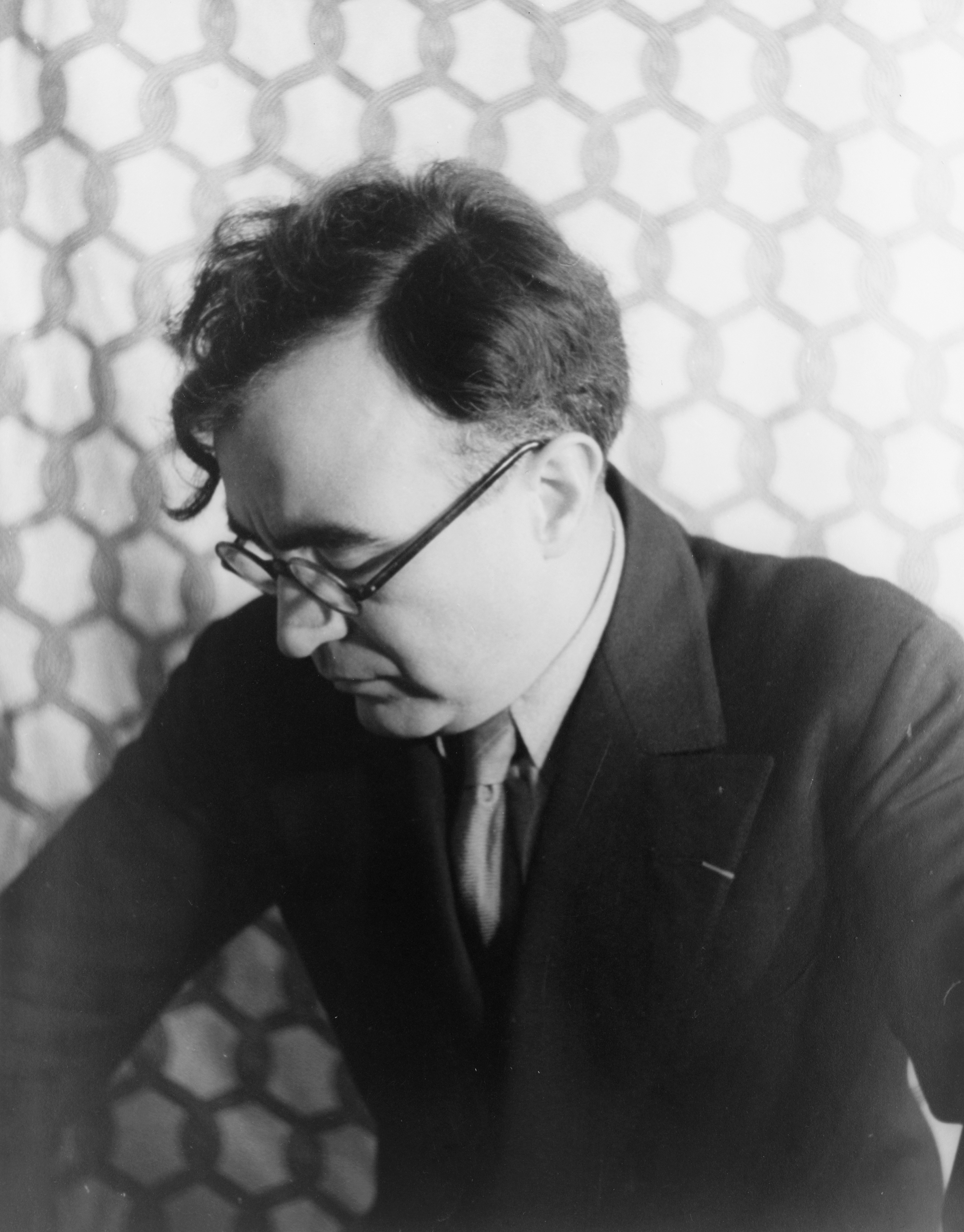
Chávez in 1937

Caballos de vapor, sinfonía de baile (also known by the English translation, Horse-Power: Ballet Symphony, and by the abbreviation of this title, H. P.) is a ballet score composed by the Mexican composer Carlos Chávez in 1926–32. An abridged concert version is published as Suite sinfónica del ballet Caballos de vapor.

== History ==
Caballos de vapor originated in discussions between the composer and the painter Agustín Lazo Adalid in 1922 or 1923 about a multi-media work concerning the effects of mechanization on society in modern-day Mexico. According to another account, however, it was only first in 1926 that the idea was born, in discussions with another visual artist, Diego Rivera, and Rivera was intended to design and produce the decor and costumes. In any case, the music was composed in stages, beginning in 1926 with the fourth movement, originally scored for a small orchestra.

It was premiered as a separate piece in a concert of the International Composers Guild at the Aeolian Hall in New York, under the baton of Eugene Goosens, on November 28, 1926. This was followed by portions of the second and third movements, which were originally intended to end with the "Danza ágil" (originally called "Gimnástica") and the "Sandunga", respectively.

The first movement was written in 1929, and was for large orchestra from the beginning. In 1931, Chávez expanded the orchestration of the second and third movements. The final touch was accomplished in February 1932 when Chávez added the "Danza general" to end the second movement.

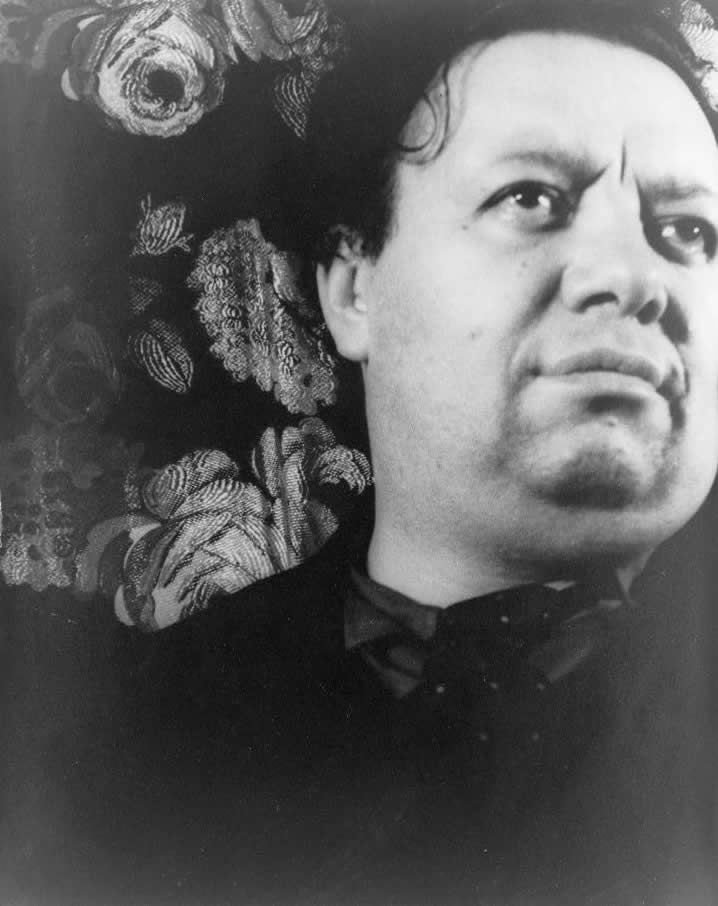
Diego Rivera, 19 March 1932

The completed ballet was premiered in Philadelphia by the Philadelphia Grand Opera Company, with the Philadelphia Orchestra conducted by Leopold Stokowski on March 31, 1932. Stage direction was by Wilhelm von Wymetal, Jr., sets and costumes were by Diego Rivera, and choreography by Catherine Littlefield. Alexis Dolinoff and Dorothie Littlefield danced the principal roles. The composer was in the audience. "A special train brought in a New York audience to add to the Philadelphia patrons. Aboard the train were, among other luminaries, Diego Rivera and his wife, the Mexican painter Frida Kahlo; George Gershwin; and Chávez's friend Aaron Copland".

In 1954, Chávez revised the ballet, restoring a few small cuts that had been made for the Philadelphia premiere and reducing the size of the orchestra somewhat. This version was partially premiered in Los Angeles in August, and the complete ballet in Portland, Oregon in October 1954.

== Instrumentation ==
The original ballet scoring was for a very large orchestra with winds mostly in fours:

Piccolo - 3 flutes - 3 oboes - cor anglais - 2 E♭ clarinets - 2 B♭ clarinets - bass clarinet - 3 bassoons - contrabassoon - soprano saxophone - tenor saxophone - 5 horns - 4 trumpets - 3 tenor trombones - bass trombone - tuba - timpani - 5 percussionists - first violins - second violins - violas - cellos - double basses

From July to September 1954, Chávez reduced the orchestration somewhat to an "a 3" basis, while retaining the saxophones. This is the scoring also used in the Suite:

Piccolo - 2 flutes - 2 oboes - cor anglais - E♭ clarinet - 2 B♭ clarinets - bass clarinet - 2 bassoons - contrabassoon - soprano saxophone - tenor saxophone - 4 horns - 3 trumpets - 2 tenor trombones - bass trombone - tuba - timpani - 3 percussionists - first violins - second violins - violas - cellos - double basses

== Musical form ==
The score is designated a "dance symphony". Though it is not among the composer's numbered symphonies, it falls into the traditional four movements of a symphony, but they are further subdivided into a succession of dances:

- I. Danza del hombre (Dance of the Man)
- II. El barco (alias Barco hacia el trópico—Boat to the Tropics)
  - Danza ágil
  - Tango de las sirenas (alias Tango, molto lento)
  - Danza general
- Intermedio tropical (alias Interludio)
- III. El trópico (The Tropics)
  - Huapango
  - Sandunga (Tempo di Sandunga)
- Intermedio II (alias Interludio II)
- IV. Danza de los hombres y las máquinas (Dance of men and machines)

The Suite omits the "Danza final" from the second movement, the second intermedio, and the entire fourth movement. Otherwise, it is identical with the ballet score in the 1954 orchestration.

== Discography ==
=== Complete ballet ===
No recording of the complete ballet has been published. Robert Parker, citing an unpublished interview with Eduardo Mata from 13 August 1980, states that by that time Mata had made a recording with the London Symphony Orchestra that "includes the music for all four movements of the ballet". However, the recording eventually issued by RCA was only made later, in December 1980, and is of the Suite (see below).

=== Symphonic Suite ===
- Danza moderna mexicana. José Pablo Moncayo, Tierra de temporal; Raúl Cosío, Los gallos; Blas Galindo, La manda; Miguel Bernal Jiménez, El chueco; Carlos Chávez, Suite de Caballos de vapor (H.P.); Carlos J. Mabarak, Balada del venado y la luna and Balada del pájaro y las doncellas. Orchestra of the National Free University of Mexico; Eduardo Mata, cond. LP recording, 3 sound discs: analog, 33⅓ rpm, stereo, 12 in. RCA Victor MKLA-65. Mexico City: RCA Victor, 1968.
- Chávez, Carlos. Suite from Horsepower: Ballet-Symphony. Louisville Orchestra; Jorge Mester, cond. LP recording, 1 disc, stereo, 33⅓ rpm, stereo, 12 in. Louisville LS-713. Louisville Orchestra First Edition Records 1971, no. 3. Louisville: Louisville Orchestra, 1971.
- International Year of the Child/Año internacional del niño. D.C. Youth Orchestra; Lyn McLain, conductor. Carlos Chávez: Caballos de vapor, selections ("Danza ágil" and "Tango de las sirenas"); Emma Lou Diemer: Youth Overture; Camargo Guarnieri: Suite Vila Rica; Nicholas [sic] Slonimsky: My Toy Balloon; Karl Kohn: Castle and Kings. LP recording, 1 audio disc: 33⅓ rpm, stereo, 12 in. Inter-American Musical Editions OAS 007. Washington, D.C.: Inter-American Musical Editions/Ediciones interamericanas de música: Technical Unit on Music, Organization of American States, 1979.
- Chávez, Carlos. Suite de Caballos de vapor (H.P.): sinfonía de baile; Chacona en mi menor de Dietrich Buxtehude; Cuatro nocturnos. London Symphony Orchestra; Eduardo Mata, conductor. Margarita Pruneda, soprano, and Claudine Carlson, mezzo-soprano (Cuatro nocturnos). Recorded in Kingsway Hall, London, December 1980. LP recording 1 audio disc: analog, 33⅓ rpm, 12 in. RCA Red Seal MRS-024. México: RCA Red Seal, 1982. Suite de Caballos de vapor reissued on CD together with Chávez, Concerto for Piano and Orchestra, on Antología de la música clásica mexicana, series 2, disc 3: Carlos Chávez. (New Philharmonia Orchestra of London, Eduardo Mata, conductor; Maria Teresa Rodríguez, piano, in the Concerto.). CD recording, 1 audio disc: digital, stereo, 4¾ in.; (also as part of 4-CD set). [without catalog number]. Series: El disco es cultura. Mexico City: Editorial Patria, 1991. Reissued again as part of the Eduardo Mata Edition: The Complete RCA Recordings, vol. 9. 2-CD set: digital, stereo, 4¾ in. RCA 74321-30985-2. [Mexico City]: Bertelsmann de México S. A. de C. V., 1995.
- Latin American Ballets. Simón Bolívar Symphony Orchestra of Venezuela; Eduardo Mata, conductor. Recorded July 1994, at the Aula Magna of Universidad Central de Venezuela, Caracas. Heitor Villa-Lobos: Uirapurú; Carlos Chávez: Suite de Caballos de vapor; Alberto Ginastera: Estancia. Music of Latin American Masters. Compact disc 1 sound disc: digital; 4¾ in. Dorian DOR-90211. Troy, NY: Dorian, 1995. Reissued as disc 6 of Latin America Alive: Eduardo Mata Sessions. (With additional works by Antonio Estévez Aponte, Silvestre Revueltas, Julián Orbón, and Manuel de Falla. CD recording, 6 sound discs: digital, 4¾ in. Dorian DSL-90914 (DIS-80101; DOR-90178; DOR-90179; DOR-90192; DOR-90120; DOR-90211). Winchester, VA: Dorian, 2009.
- Mi alma mexicana/My Mexican Soul. Chávez: H. P. Suite (excerpt: III, El trópico), with works by José Pablo Moncayo, Gustavo E. Campa, Ricardo Castro, Candelario Huízar, Manuel Ponce, Juventino Rosas, Arturo Márquez, Silvestre Revueltas, Federico Ibarra, Eugenio Toussaint, Mario Lavista, and Enrico Chapela. Philharmonic orchestra of the Americas; Alondra de la Parra, conductor. Pablo Sáinz Villegas, guitar; Daniel Andai, violin; Alex Brown, piano. Recorded at the recital hall of the Performing Arts Center, Purchase College, State University of New York, 28 January to 1 February 2010. CD recording, 2 discs: digital, stereo, 4¾ in. Sony Classical 88697 75555 2. New York: Sony Corporation, [2010].

== Sources ==
- García Morillo, Roberto. 1960. Carlos Chávez, vida y obra. México: Fondo de Cultura Económica. ISBN 968-16-0222-6.
- Parker, Robert L. (1983). Carlos Chávez, Mexico's Modern-Day Orpheus. Twayne's Music Series. Boston: Twayne Publishers. ISBN 0-8057-9455-7.
- Parker, Robert L. (1985). "Carlos Chávez and the Ballet: A Study in Persistence". Dance Chronicle. 8 (3/4): 179–210. doi:10.1080/01472528408568910.

Footnotes
