= Stefan Schneider =

Stefan Schneider may refer to:

- Stefan Schneider (athlete), Swiss track and field athlete
- Stefan Schneider (director), director of documentary Super Comet: After the Impact
- Stefan Schneider, fictional character in the Dead Space: Salvage comic book
- Stefan Schneider (figure skating), Canadian figure skater who competed at the 2008 Canadian Figure Skating Championships
- Stefan Schneider (ice hockey born 1975), Swiss ice hockey defenceman
- Stefan Schneider (ice hockey born 1989), Canadian ice hockey player
- Stefan Schneider (musician), member of To Rococo Rot
