= Blood vessel (disambiguation) =

A blood vessel is a component of the circulatory system that transports blood.

Blood Vessel may also refer to:

- Blood Vessel (2019 film), an Australian horror film
- Blood Vessel (2023 film), a Nigerian drama thriller film
