= Warriors of Virtue: The Return to Tao =

- Directed by: Michael Vickerman
- Written by: Kentucky Robinson
- Story by: Rex Piano; Dennis Law
- Produced by: Bruce Gordon; Xiaowan Li; Tom Parkinson; Seth Willenson; Forrest Sloan Wright
- Starring: Kevin Smith; Nathan Phillips; Nina Liu; Shedrack Anderson III
- Cinematography: Zeng Nianping
- Edited by: Cindy Clarkson
- Production companies: Miramax Films; Crawford Productions; Film Brokers International; International Film Group; WOV2 Productions
- Distributed by: Buena Vista Home Entertainment
- Release date: 22 October 2002 (United States)
- Running time: 93 minutes
- Country: Australia
- Language: English

Warriors of Virtue: The Return to Tao (also known as simply Warriors of Virtue 2 or Warriors of Virtue 2: The Return to Tao) is a 2002 Australian fantasy martial arts film directed by Michael Vickerman and starring Kevin Smith, Nathan Phillips, Nina Liu, and Shedrack Anderson III. It is the straight-to-DVD sequel to the 1997 film Warriors of Virtue and was released by Buena Vista Home Entertainment under the Miramax Home Entertainment label.

== Plot ==
Despite only a few years having passed in the real world, many decades have passed in Tao, the parallel universe from the first movie. The kangaroos have changed over the years, now appearing little different from normal humans, and a new villain, Dogon, seizes control of Tao from its young queen. Ryan Jeffers and his friend Chucky, now 16-year-old martial arts competitors in Beijing, find themselves unexpectedly transported to Tao where it is shown that they are to become Warriors of Virtue.

== Cast ==
- Nathan Phillips as Ryan Jeffers
- Kevin Smith as Dogon
- Nina Liu as Amythis
- Shedrack Anderson III as Chucky
- Shuntian Guan as Yun
- Bao Cheng Li as Yee
- Jiaolong Sun as Lai
- Wei Wang as Chi / Yasbin
- Ying Liang as Tsun
- Brandon Lin as Quan
- Wang Zhu as Remo
- Fusen Chen as Matu
- Marina as Keo
- Weiguo Wang as Chieftain
- Jeff Carrara as Coach

== Production ==
Crawford Prods. produced the sequel with Lance Thompson of Film Brokers Intl. as co-producer. Dennis Law, Ron Law and Jeremy Law are exec producers on the project. The worldwide rights were picked up by International Film Group. Miramax Films acquired domestic and Canadian rights, excluding French-speaking Canada, to the film from the International Film Group (IFG). The Film was screened at the 2003 American Film Market. Had the film been successful, it would've served as a backdoor pilot for a proposed TV series.

== Death of Kevin Tod Smith ==
The shooting was touched by misfortune when actor Kevin Smith died while visiting a film set in China. On February 6, 2002, while waiting for the car back to his motel, and after completing work on Warriors of Virtue 2, Smith decided to walk around the Central China Television film studio grounds, and climbed a flimsy prop tower in a set of another film, lost his footing and fell approximately three stories onto concrete. He was taken to a hospital, then transferred to Beijing. He lapsed into a coma and was on life support for 10 days, until it was ended. He died on February 9, 2002.
