= Nathan Phillips (actor) =

Australian actor

- Born: 13 March 1980 (age 46); Sunbury, Victoria, Australia
- Education: La Trobe University
- Occupation: Actor
- Years active: 1999–present
- Known for: Australian Rules (2002); Wolf Creek (2005); Snakes on a Plane (2006); These Final Hours (2014)

Nathan Scott Phillips (born 13 March 1980) is an Australian actor.

== Early life ==
Phillips was born on 13 March 1980 in Sunbury, Victoria, Australia. He studied English literature at La Trobe University in Melbourne, with the intention of becoming a teacher, before he turned to acting as a career.

== Career ==
Phillips' professional acting career began in 1999, with a role in long-running Australian soap opera Neighbours. His television career was later followed by roles in Child Star: The Shirley Temple Story, Blue Heelers, Something in the Air and The Saddle Club.

In 2002, Phillips made his feature film debut with a role in Warriors of Virtue: The Return to Tao (also starring Kevin Smith, Shedrack Anderson III and Nina Liu). His next role, the lead in Australian Rules, earned him a nomination for the Film Critics Circle of Australia’s Best Actor award, alongside David Gulpilil, Guy Pearce and Vince Colosimo.

Phillips's film career has seen him star in both Australian productions, such as Take Away (with Rose Byrne), One Perfect Day (with Abbie Cornish) and Under the Radar, as well as Hollywood productions such as Chernobyl Diaries, Redline and Surfer, Dude and most notably Snakes on a Plane. He is perhaps most known for his role as backpacker Ben Mitchell in the 2005 hit horror film Wolf Creek. After the success of this film, Phillips moved to Los Angeles, where he was based for several years.

Although tipped for big things in Hollywood after the success of Wolf Creek, Phillips chose to go travelling for long periods of time, rather than focus on his career as an actor. Phillips' career has, to date, consisted mostly of roles in low budget films and television work, such as his role as Tom Wills, Australia's first significant cricketer and father of Australian rules football. In 2020, Phillips appeared in the Nine Network series Halifax: Retribution.

From 2019, Phillips has been back living in his native Australia, working on television and film projects. In addition to acting, Phillips was a producer of 2019's Blood Vessel.

== Filmography ==
=== Film ===
Year	Title	Role	Notes
2002	Australian Rules	Gary "Blacky" Black	Feature film
2002	Warriors of Virtue: The Return to Tao	Ryan Jeffers	Feature film
2003	Take Away	Dave	Feature film
2004	Under the Radar	Brandon	Feature film
2004	One Perfect Day	Trig	Feature film
2005	Wolf Creek	Ben Mitchell	Feature film
2005	You and Your Stupid Mate	Philip	Feature film
2005	The Opposite of Velocity	Kevin	Short film
2006	Snakes on a Plane	Sean Jones	Feature film
2007	West	Jerry	Feature film
2007	Redline	Carlo	Feature film
2008	Surfer, Dude	Baker Smith	Feature film
2008	Dying Breed	Jack	Feature film
2009	Balibo	Malcolm Rennie	Feature film
2009	Message from the CEO	Eric	Short film
2010	Summer Coda	Joey	Feature film
2010	Quit	Benji	Feature film
2012	Satellite of Love	Samuel / Catherine's ex-boyfriend	Feature film
2012	Chernobyl Diaries	Michael	Feature film
2012	Degenerate	Young Blair	Feature film
2013	These Final Hours	James	Feature film
2014	The Amateur	Jimmy	Feature film
2019	Blood Vessel	Sinclair	Feature film
2019	Tuscaloosa	Deputy	Feature film
2019	3 Day Weekend	Schnappsie	Feature film
2021	The Devil Below	Cain	Feature film
2023	Kane	Frankie	Feature film
2024	Kid Snow	Billy	Feature film
2024	13th Summer	Ben Trainor	Feature film
2024	Accident	Mick	Short film
TBA	Homeward	Morgan	In post-production
TBA	Spines	Logan	In production

=== Television ===
Year	Title	Role	Notes
1999	Neighbours	John "Teabag" Teasdale	TV series, 13 episodes
2000	Eugénie Sandler P.I.	Leo	2 episodes
2001	Frontline	Phoenix	1 episode
2001	Child Star: The Shirley Temple Story	Hugh	TV movie
2001	Blue Heelers	Cameron Sharpe	1 episode
2001	The Saddle Club	Red O'Malley	TV series, 26 episodes
2002	The Saddle Club: Adventures at Pine Hollow	Red O'Malley	Direct-to-video movie
2002	Something in the Air	Angus Moore	12 episodes
2004	Stingers	Charlie Sanderson	1 episode
2012	Outlaw Country		TV movie
2013	Tiny Commando	CJ	Miniseries, 2 episodes
2014	The Bridge	Jack Dobbs	7 episodes
2016	Hunters	Flynn Carroll	TV series, 13 episodes
2016	Tom Wills	Tom Wills	TV movie
2020	Halifax: Retribution	Jack McCarthy	2 episodes
2021	RFDS	Mikey	1 episode
2025	NCIS: Sydney	Finn	1 episode
2025	Good Cop/Bad Cop	Tommy Boucher	Season 1, episode 8: "Skeleton"

== Awards and nominations ==
Year	Work	Award	Category	Result
2002	Australian Rules	Film Critics Circle of Australia	Best Actor – Male	Nominated
2002	Australian Rules	IF Awards	Best Actor	Nominated
2014	These Final Hours	Sitges Film Festival	Best Actor	Won
2015	These Final Hours	AFCA Awards	Best Actor	Nominated
2019	Blood Vessel	FilmQuest Cthulhu	Best Actor – Feature	Nominated
2019	Blood Vessel	FilmQuest Cthulhu	Best Ensemble Cast – Feature	Nominated
2019	Blood Vessel	FilmQuest Cthulhu	Best Feature Film	Nominated
