= Howard Shanet =

- Born: November 9, 1918; Brooklyn, New York, U.S.
- Died: June 19, 2006 (aged 87); Manhattan, New York, U.S.
- Spouse: Bernice Grafstein

Academic background
- Education: Columbia University (B.A., M.A.)

Academic work
- Discipline: Composition
- Institutions: Columbia University

Howard Shanet (9 November 1918 – 19 June 2006) was a U.S. conductor and composer. He was also a music professor at Columbia University, and the chairman of its music department from 1972–1978.

== Biography ==
Howard Shanet was born on 9 November 1918 in Brooklyn, New York, and started his musical career as a cellist, gaining a Bachelor's degree from Columbia in 1939 and a Master's in Musicology in 1941.

After military service in World War II, he studied musical composition with Bohuslav Martinů and Aaron Copland and conducting with Serge Koussevitzky and Fritz Stiedry. During the early 1950s, he was conducting assistant to Leonard Bernstein at the New York Philharmonic. In 1953, he joined Columbia's faculty as Professor of Music, later becoming chairman of its music department from 1972–1978. In later years, he was appointed a professor emeritus.

As a visiting conductor, he appeared with several major U.S. orchestras, including the New York Philharmonic and the Boston Symphony Orchestra. He composed music for orchestra, string quartet, and band. He also conducted performances of operas at Columbia, including the world premiere of Carlos Chávez's The Visitors.

He was the husband of neurophysiologist Bernice Grafstein Shanet, and the father of film and commercial director Laurence Shanet.

Shanet died in Manhattan on June 19, 2006, at age 87.

== Publications ==
In 1956, Shanet wrote the music textbook Learn to Read Music. He wrote Philharmonic: A History of New York's Orchestra in 1975 and wrote an introduction and historical notes to a compilation of early works on the history of the orchestra called Early Histories of the New York Philharmonic.

== Archival Sources ==
- Finding aid to the Howard Shanet papers at Columbia University. Rare Book & Manuscript Library.
