= Bernice Shanet =

Canadian neurophysiologist

- Born: September 17, 1929 (age 97); Toronto, Ontario, Canada
- Occupations: Neurophysiologist; professor
- Title: Vincent and Brooke Astor Distinguished Professor of Neuroscience
- Spouse: Howard Shanet
- Children: Laurence Shanet

Academic background
- Education: University of Toronto (B.A.)}; McGill University (Ph.D.)

Academic work
- Institutions: Weill Cornell Medicine

Bernice Grafstein Shanet (born September 17, 1929) is a Canadian neurophysiologist, a professor at Weill Cornell Medical College in New York and a noted specialist in neuroregeneration research. Shanet is a Professor of Physiology and Biophysics at Weill Cornell Medical College, the holder of the Vincent and Brooke Astor Distinguished Professorship in Neuroscience at Weill Cornell Medical College, the Professor of Neuroscience for the Brain and Mind Research Institute at Weill Cornell Medical College and the first woman ever to serve as president of the American Society for Neuroscience. Shanet is famous for her studies of the transport of materials down the axon nerves and her thesis work on the mechanism of cortical spreading depression, which became a classic in its field and is acknowledged even today.

== Biography ==
Shanet was born in Toronto, Ontario, Canada, on September 17, 1929. She attended the University of Toronto starting in 1947 where she enrolled in the Physiology and Biochemistry Honors Course. She graduated from the University of Toronto in 1951 with a B.A. in Physiology. Shanet then moved on to McGill University in Montreal, Quebec, Canada for graduate school, where she produced her well renowned thesis on the mechanism of cortical spreading depression for her PhD. She eventually received her PhD in Physiology from McGill University in 1954 under Benedict Delisle Burns, who helped Shanet work on her graduate thesis. She did postgraduate work in the Department of Anatomy at University College London for 2 years, but she returned as a junior faculty member to McGill shortly thereafter and began to work once again under Benedict Delisle Burns. As Shanet became interested in how connections among nerve cells are formed, she began to prepare herself for work in this area by studying with the eminent embryologist, Viktor Hamburger, at Washington University, and by taking the Embryology Course at the Woods Hole Marine Biological Laboratory. She was consequently invited by the well-known developmentalist, Paul Alfred Weiss, to join the faculty of The Rockefeller University, where she began her research on nervous system regeneration which has been her primary research field since then. In 1969, she joined the Department of Physiology at Weill Cornell Medical College, where she remains a Professor of Physiology and Biophysics and is now the Vincent and Brooke Astor Distinguished Professor in Neuroscience.

== Works ==
During her work as a graduate student she trained as an electrophysiologist, specifically focusing on correlations between structure and function in the cerebral cortex. Then for her PhD thesis, which Shanet carried out under the guidance of Benedict Delise Burns, she worked on an electrophysiological analysis of the phenomenon of cortical spreading depression in the cerebral cortex. This phenomenon has been recognized as playing an important role in migraine, stroke and other cortical pathology. Her contributions established the role of interneuronal movement of potassium ions in propagation of spreading depression. She subsequently became interested in nervous system development and regeneration, and is known for her work on intracellular transport of protein in normal and regenerating neurons, as well as other forms of molecular signaling among various cell types in the brain. Her work on chronic changes in electrical activity following cortical injury, and the organization and development of callosal connections in the cortex were also pioneering studies in the analysis of cortical activity with respect to the underlying tissue structure. Shanet's research at Weill Cornell has been focused on the regenerating goldfish visual system, with a continuing focus on axonal transport and the role it plays in defining the process of regeneration. Throughout her career, Shanet has been interested in the association between function and structure in nervous tissue.

== Honors and awards ==
Shanet is a Life Trustee and Treasurer of the Grass Foundation, a member of the Dana Alliance for Brain Initiatives, and a member of the Council of the New York Hall of Science. She has been a member of the National Advisory Council of the National Institute of Neurological Disorders and Stroke (NINDS), a Chairman of the Committee for Brain Science of the National Research Council, and a member of the Research Council's Advisory Committee for USSR and Eastern Europe. She has been a scientific adviser for voluntary health organizations concerned with central nervous system injury, such as the National Spinal Cord Injury Foundation and Paralyzed Veterans of America. The National Spinal Cord Injury Foundation twice awarded her its L.W. Freeman Award of Merit, and in 1982, she received an award from the New York Metropolitan Chapter of American Women in Science as an outstanding woman scientist. She has been honored with a number of awards for excellence in teaching given by Weill Cornell Medical College. She has been a member of the Society for Neuroscience since its start and served as a member of its Council from 1972 to 1976, as treasurer from 1977 to 1980 and as president from 1985 to 1986. Shanet received Women in Neuroscience's 2003 Mika Salpeter Lifetime Achievement Award. The Mika Salpeter Lifetime Achievement Award, honors an individual with outstanding career achievements in neuroscience, who has also significantly promoted the professional advancement of women within the field.

== Personal life ==
Shanet was married since 1963 to Howard S. Shanet, who was a conductor, composer and Professor of Music at Columbia University, until his death in June 2006. They have a son, Laurence P. Shanet, who is a television producer and director.
