= Craig Timberlake =

American actor (1920–2006)

Craig Timberlake (October 30, 1920 – December 31, 2006) was an American stage actor, singer, author, and educator. A talented bass, Timberlake performed in operas and musicals in theatres throughout North America in addition to acting in plays from the 1940s through the 1980s.

== Biography ==
Born in Oil City, Pennsylvania, Timberlake was a member of Phi Beta Kappa and earned a BA from Southern Methodist University and an MA and EdD from Columbia University. He served as a Lt. Colonel in the United States Air Force during World War II. He began his performance career after the end of the war. He made his Broadway debut as Go-To in Gilbert and Sullivan's The Mikado in October 1949, returning to Broadway three more through the summer of 1950 as Bob Beckett in H.M.S. Pinafore, the Foreman of the Jury in Trial By Jury, and Rowland in William Shakespeare's As You Like It. The latter production starred Katharine Hepburn and toured throughout the United States.

In the early 1950s, Timberlake joined Fred Waring's "Pennsylvanians", performing and recording with the group for many years. In 1954 he won the American Theatre Wing's singing competition which led to his New York City recital debut in March of that year at Town Hall. In May 1957 he created the role of The Physician in the world premiere of Carlos Chávez's The Visitors. Later that year he joined the roster of singers at the New York City Opera where his roles included "The Accompanist" in the world premiere of Hugo Weisgall's Six Characters in Search of an Author.

Timberlake continued to perform in plays, operas, concerts, and musicals throughout North America up into the 1980s. He notably starred as Henry Higgins in the 1964 National tour of My Fair Lady. He also taught for many years at Teachers College, Columbia University where he was chairman of the department of music and music education. He also served as Chairman of the American Academy of Teachers of Singing and served for a time as the President of the New York Singing Teachers' Association. He retired from teaching in 1991, relocating to Ogunquit, Maine where he lived for the rest of his life. In his later years he worked as a producer and music consultant for the Community of Jesus's touring choir, Gloriae Dei Cantores, for a total of 13 recordings. He died in 2006 in Oklahoma City, Oklahoma while visiting his sister.

Timberlake was also a writer. His book The Bishop of Broadway: David Belasco, His Life and Work was published in 1954. He also contributed articles to Music Educators Journal, The Review of Education, the Bulletin of the Council for Research in Music Education, and Teachers College Record.
