= The Visitors (opera) =

Opera by Carlos Chávez

- Opera by Carlos Chávez
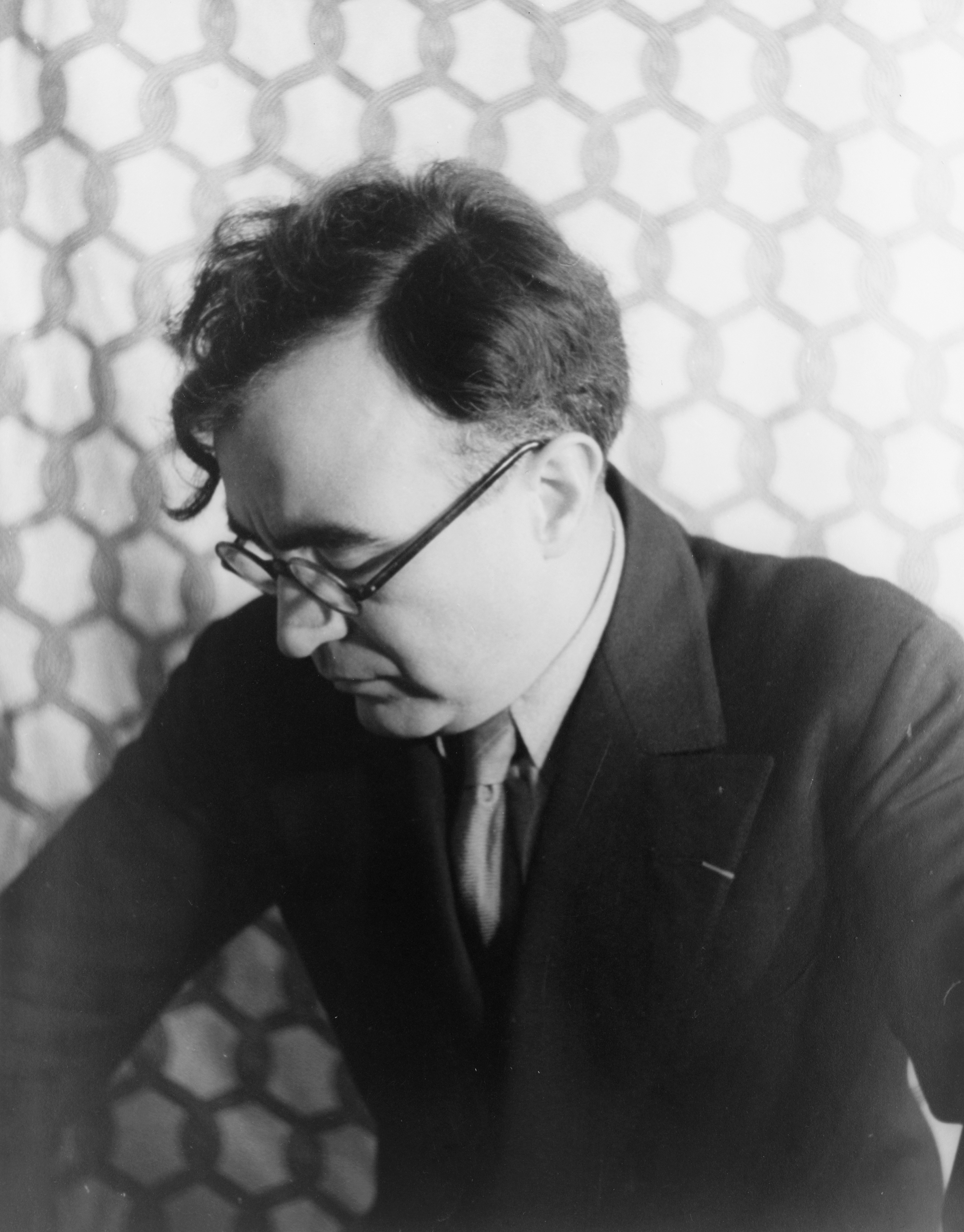
- Chávez, photographed in 1937 by Carl Van Vechten
- Other title: Panfilo and Lauretta (1st version)
- Librettist: Chester Kallman
- Language: English
- Based on: characters in The Decameron
- Premiere: 9 May 1957 (1st version, under the title Panfilo and Lauretta); Brander Matthews Theatre at Columbia University, New York

The Visitors is an opera in three acts and a prologue composed by Carlos Chávez to an English-language libretto by the American poet Chester Kallman. The work was Chávez's only opera. Its first version, with the title Panfilo and Lauretta, premiered in New York City in 1957. The final version with the title The Visitors was premiered in Guanajuato City, Mexico, in 1999, twenty years after the composer's death. The story is set in 14th century Tuscany during the time of the Black Death. The libretto (like those for Pagliacci and Ariadne auf Naxos) uses the device of a play within a play to reflect and intensify the relationships between the protagonists, who in this case are loosely based on characters in The Decameron.

== Performance history ==
The Visitors was originally commissioned in 1953 by Lincoln Kirstein, with the intention of premiering it in 1954 in New York City. Chávez began working on the score with the provisional title of The Tuscan Players in the spring of 1953 and continued working on it until 1956. The opera finally premiered with the title Panfilo and Lauretta on 9 May 1957 in the Brander Matthews Theatre at Columbia University, conducted by Howard Shanet. It was then presented on three occasions in Mexico, conducted by the composer: in October 1959 (in English) in the Palacio de Bellas Artes in Mexico City; in 1963, again at the Palacio de Bellas Artes, but in a Spanish translation by Noel Lindsay and Eduardo Hernández Moncada with the title El amor propiciado (Love Propitiated); and in 1968 with the title of Los Visitantes (The Visitors) as part of the cultural programme for the XIX Olympic Games.

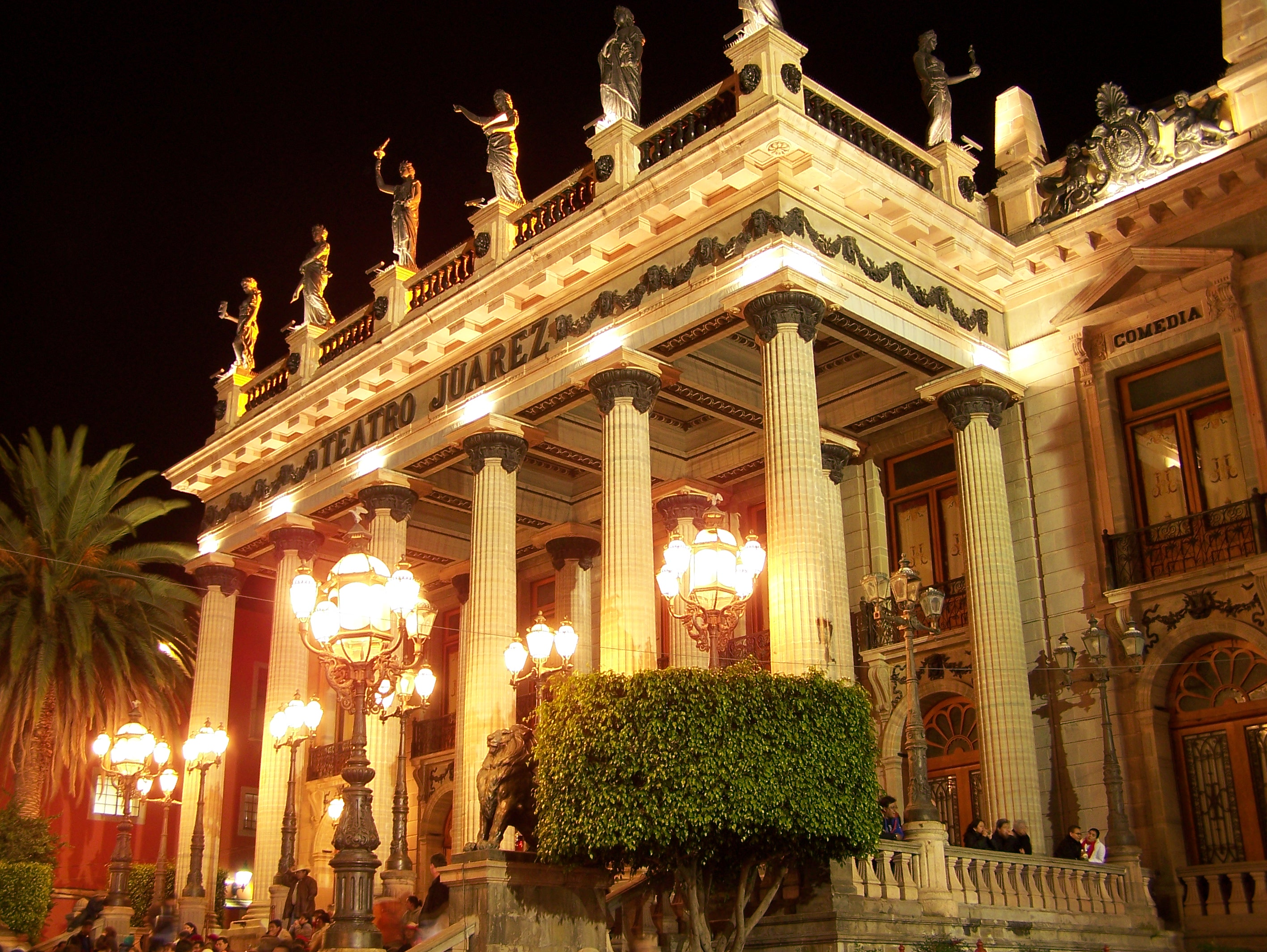
The Teatro Juarez in Guanajuato City, where the third and final version of The Visitors premiered in 1999

In the succeeding thirty years the opera went unperformed apart from excerpts conducted by Chávez at the Cabrillo Music Festival in Aptos, California, in 1973. However, he continued to revise the score up until his death in 1978. In 1997, his daughter entrusted the manuscript and her father's revisions to the composer and musicologist Max Lifchitz, who within two years had prepared the definitive version of the score. The world premiere of this version took place in October 1999 (the centenary of Chávez's birth) during the Festival Internacional Cervantino in the Teatro Juárez, Guanajuato City. Conducted by José Areán with stage direction by Sergio Vela, the opera was performed with its original English libretto and its final title, The Visitors.

== Scoring ==
The opera is scored for 5 solo voices (soprano, mezzo-soprano, tenor, baritone and bass; an SATB chorus; and an orchestra consisting of 2 flutes, piccolo, 2 oboes, cor anglais, 2 clarinets, bass clarinet, 2 bassoons, contrabassoon, 4 French horns, 2 trumpets, 3 trombones, tuba, harp, timpani, percussion, and strings.

== Roles ==
Roles
Role	Voice type	Premiere cast, 9 May 1957 Conductor: Howard Shanet
Lauretta (also Psyche, Mary Magdalene and Eve)	soprano	Sylvia Stahlman
Elissa (also Venus, Procuress, and Lilith)	mezzo-soprano	Mary McMurray
Panfilo (also Cupid, Centurion, and Adam)	tenor	Frank Porretta
Dioneo (also Sadducee and Satan)	baritone	Thomas Stewart
The Monk (also Luxury)	bass	Craig Timberlake
The Physician	bass	Michael Kermoyan

== Synopsis ==
Time: 14th century
Place: Tuscany

=== Act 1 ===
Lauretta, Elissa, Panfilo and Dioneo have sought refuge from the Black Plague in a villa near Florence. To pass the time they devise and perform plays. The first to be performed is devised by Panfilo and tells the story of Cupid and Psyche with Panfilo playing Cupid and Lauretta playing Psyche. The play is interrupted when a loud knocking is heard on the door to the villa.

=== Act 2 ===
After a discussion about the wisdom of letting a stranger in, they open the door to a monk who suggests that they put on a Biblical play. At first they make fun of him, but then devise a play based on the story of Mary Magdalene, with a prologue about the story of Adam and Eve. At the end of the play, the Monk opens the door to a crowd of strangers demanding to be let in. The monk then falls dead of the plague. Lauretta realizes they have been betrayed by him and urges Panfilo to drive the strangers out with his sword. As Lauretta, Elissa, Panfilo and Dioneo blame themselves for what has happened, the chorus of strangers sing of the end of the world.

=== Act 3 ===
Two months have passed. The courtyard of the villa is filled with the sick and dying strangers. A physician is looking after them. Dioneo, who has been sleeping on a table, wakes up and tells the physician of a nightmare he has had and asks him about Lauretta's condition. The physician tells him that despite being infected with the plague, she will survive. He attributes her recovery to the power of love. Lauretta appears and asks about Panfilo, who had left the villa. Panfilo returns unexpectedly, tells of the horrors he has seen in the city, and berates his companions for living in their isolated villa without knowledge of the death and suffering outside. Elissa and Dioneo explain to him that Lauretta has been ill but is recovering. Lauretta interrupts them to say she wants to stop acting and confesses to Panfilo that the vision of suffering and death has made her realize her love for him. Elissa becomes furious that Panfilo would accept the love of woman who had just been playing a role, when she had always loved him. Dioneo urges her to forgive Lauretta and Panfilo and to seek a life outside the villa. Elissa realizing that Dioneo is burning with fever and about to die, forgives the lovers. The physician asks them to put on a play for the other patients. It is Dioneo's dying wish that they resume the story of Cupid and Psyche that was interrupted in the first act. The play (and the opera) ends with Venus forgiving Cupid and Psyche and Cupid offering Psyche fruit from the tree of eternal life. The curtain comes down with the lovers' song of triumph.

== Recording ==
- Carlos Chávez: The Visitors – Lourdes Ambriz (Lauretta), Encarnación Vázquez (Elissa), Randolph Locke (Panfilo), Jesús Suaste (Dioneo), Marc Embree (The Monk); Orquesta y Coro del Teatro de Bellas Artes; José Areán (conductor). Label: BMG Entertainment México RV3 743217834722.
