= Carlos Chávez =

Mexican composer (1899–1978)

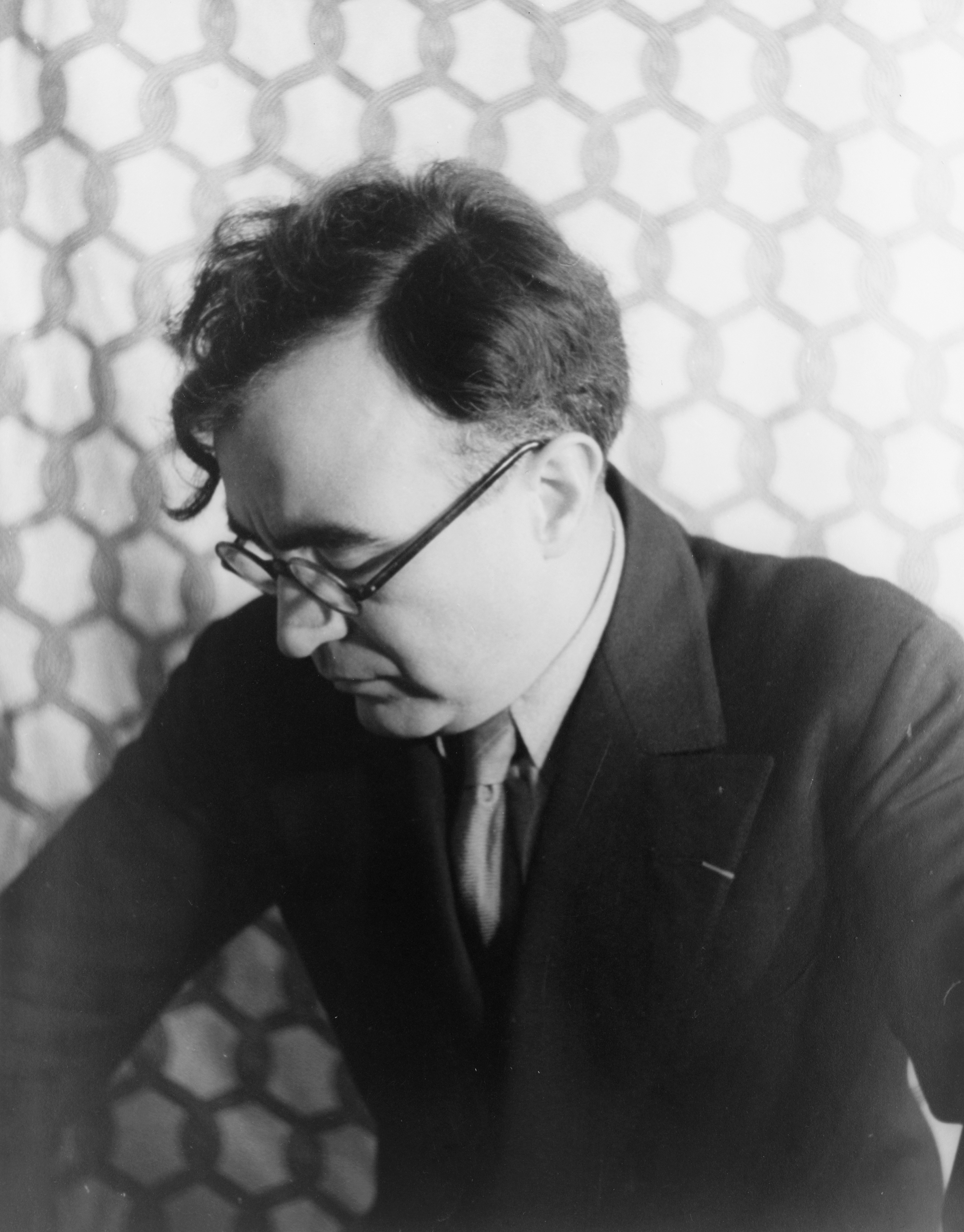
Carlos Chávez photographed by Carl Van Vechten (1937)

Carlos Antonio de Padua Chávez y Ramírez (13 June 1899 – 2 August 1978) was a Mexican composer, conductor, music theorist, educator, journalist, and founder and director of the Mexican Symphonic Orchestra. He was influenced by native Mexican cultures. Of his six symphonies, the second, or Sinfonía india, which uses native Yaqui percussion instruments, is probably the most popular.

== Biography ==
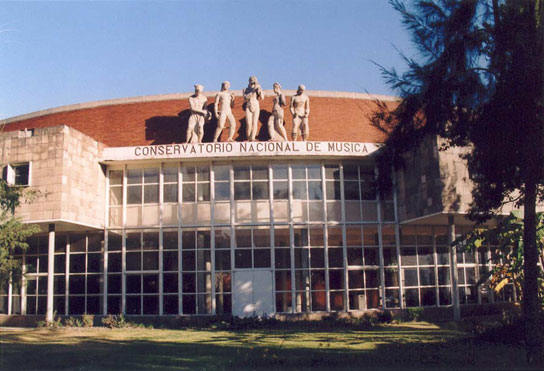
National Conservatory of Music, México City

The seventh child of a criollo family, Chávez was born on Tacuba Avenue in Mexico City, near the suburb of Popotla. His paternal grandfather, José María Chávez Alonso, a former governor of the state of Aguascalientes, had been executed by the French Army in April 1864 during its second invasion of Mexico. His father, Augustín Chávez, who died when Carlos was barely three years old, invented a plough that was produced and used in the United States.

Carlos had his first piano lessons from his brother Manuel, and later on he was taught piano by Asunción Parra, Manuel Ponce, and Pedro Luis Ozagón, and harmony by Juan Fuentes. His family often holidayed in Tlaxcala, Michoacán, Guanajuato, Oaxaca, and other places where the cultural influence of the Mexican indigenous peoples was still very strong.

In 1916, Chávez and friends started a cultural journal, Gladios, and this led to his joining the staff of the Mexico City newspaper El Universal in 1924. In the succeeding 36 years he was to write over 500 items for this paper.

After the Mexican Revolution and the installation of a democratically elected president, Álvaro Obregón, Chávez became one of the first exponents of Mexican nationalist music with ballets on Aztec themes.

In September 1922, Chávez married Otilia Ortiz and they went on honeymoon to Europe, from October 1922 until April 1923, spending two weeks in Vienna, five months in Berlin, and eight or ten days in Paris. During the latter visit he met Paul Dukas. Some months later, in December 1923, Chávez visited the United States for the first time, returning in March 1924. Chávez again went to New York City in September 1926 and stayed there until June 1928. Upon his return to Mexico, Chávez became director of the Orquesta Sinfónica Mexicana (Mexican Symphonic Orchestra), later renamed Orquesta Sinfónica de México (Mexico's Symphonic Orchestra); the country's first permanent orchestra, started by a musicians' labor union. Chávez was instrumental in taking the orchestra on tour through Mexico's rural areas.

In December 1928, Chávez was appointed director of Mexico's National Conservatory of Music—a position he held for a total of five years (until March 1933, and again for eight months in 1934). In that capacity, Chávez spearheaded three Spanish: academias de investigación, two concerned with collecting and cataloguing indigenous music and its literature, and the third to study the uses of old and new scales.

In 1937, Chávez published a book, Toward a New Music, which is one of the first books in which a composer speaks about electronic music. In 1938, he conducted a series of concerts with the NBC Symphony Orchestra, during a period of absence by the orchestra's regular conductor, Arturo Toscanini. In 1940 he produced concerts at New York's Museum of Modern Art, and by 1945, Chávez had come to be regarded as the foremost Mexican composer and conductor.

From January 1947 until 1952, Chávez served as director-general of the National Institute of Fine Arts. In his first year, he formed the National Symphony Orchestra, which supplanted the older OSM as Mexico's premier orchestra and led to the disbanding of the older ensemble. Throughout all this time, Chávez maintained a busy international touring schedule.

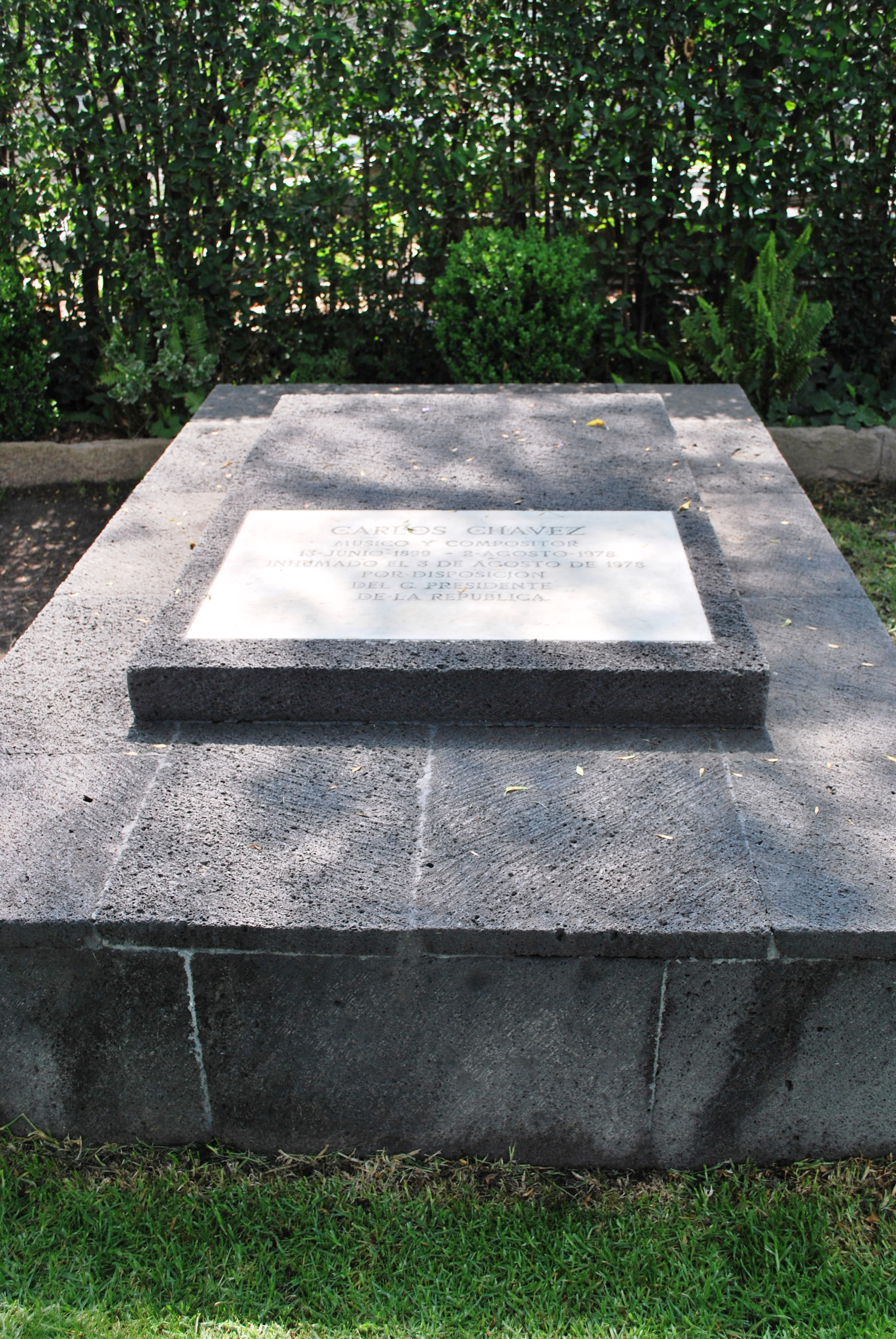
Chávez's tomb in the Panteón de Dolores, Mexico City

In May 1953 he was commissioned by Lincoln Kirstein, director of the New York City center of Music and Drama, for a three-act opera to a libretto by Chester Kallman based on a story by Boccaccio, to be titled The Tuscan Players. Intended to be finished in August 1954, it was first postponed to April 1955, but only finally completed in 1956, by which time the title had been changed twice, first to Pánfilo and Lauretta, then to El amor propiciado. The City Center waived its rights to the first performance, which was given under the title Panfilo and Lauretta in the Brander Matthews Theatre at Columbia University in New York on 9 May 1957, under the baton of Howard Shanet. Stage direction was by Bill Butler, scenic design by Herbert Senn and Helen Pond, and costumes by Sylvia Wintle. The principal singers were Sylvia Stahlman, Frank Porretta, Craig Timberlake, Mary McMurray, Michael Kermoyan, and Thomas Stewart. The opera would be revised twice more and the title changed again to Los visitantes (The Visitors), for productions in 1968 and 1973, in Mexico City and Aptos, California, respectively. From 1958 to 1959 he was the Charles Eliot Norton professor at Harvard University, and the public lectures he gave there were published as a book, Musical Thought.

From 1970 to 1973, Chávez served as the music director of the Cabrillo Festival of Contemporary Music. His orchestral composition Discovery (1969) had previously been commission by the Festival and was first performed there.

Failing health and financial setbacks forced Chávez to sell his house in the Lomas de Chapultepec neighborhood of Mexico City and move in with his daughter Anita in Coyoacán, in the fringes of the Mexican capital, where he died quietly on 2 August 1978, his wife having died in April.

Chávez's manuscripts and papers are housed in the Music Division of the New York Public Library for the Performing Arts and in the National Archive of Mexico, in Mexico City.

== Musical style ==
Chávez's music does not fall into clear stylistic periods, but rather cumulates elements in a process of continual synthesis. The juvenilia, up to 1921 and consisting primarily of piano compositions, is essentially Romantic, with Robert Schumann as the main influence. A period of nationalistic leanings was initiated in 1921 with the Aztec-themed ballet El fuego nuevo (The New Fire), followed by a second ballet, Los cuatro soles (The Four Suns), in 1925.

During his time in New York City between 1924 and 1928, Chávez acquired a taste for the then-fashionable abstract and quasi-scientific music, as is reflected in the titles of many of his compositions written between 1923 and 1934: Polígonos for piano (Polygons, 1923), Exágonos for voice and piano (Hexagons, 1924), 36 for piano (1925), Energía for nine instruments (Energy, 1925), Espiral for violin and piano (Spiral, 1934), and an unfinished orchestral score titled Pirámides (Pyramids).

The culmination of this period was the ballet H. P. (i.e., Horse Power), also known by the Spanish title Caballos de vapor (1926–31). H. P. is a colorfully orchestrated score of ample dimensions and dense, compact atmosphere, notable for its dynamism and vitality, revealing the influence of Stravinsky and at the same time returning to folkloric and popular elements, with dances such as the sandunga, tango, huapango, and foxtrot. Such nationalisms would appear through the 1930s, notably in the Second Symphony (the Sinfonía índia of 1935–36, one of the few works by Chávez to quote actual Native-American themes), but only sporadically in later compositions. Diego Rivera designed the sets and costumes for the ballet's premiere in Philadelphia in 1932.

Although this early period saw the creation of the Sonatina for violin and piano (1924), it was only in the 1930s that Chávez returned to another of the main musical interests of his maturity, prefigured in the juvenilia: the traditional genres of the sonata, quartet, symphony, and concerto. He composed six numbered symphonies. The first, titled Sinfonía de Antígona (1933), was reworked from incidental music for Jean Cocteau's Antigone, an adaptation of Sophocles' tragedy. In it, Chávez sought to create an archaic ambiance through the use of modal polyphony, harmonies built on fourths and fifths, and a predominant use of wind instruments.

In the fourth of his Norton lectures of 1958–59, titled "Repetition in Music", he described a mode of composition already observable in many of his compositions since the 1920s, in which "The idea of repetition and variation can be replaced by the notion of constant rebirth, of true derivation: a stream that never comes back to its source; a stream in eternal development, like a spiral ..." A notable early example of this method is Soli I (1933), the first work acknowledged by the composer to have been consciously organized according to this principle. It only became a regular feature, however, beginning with Invención I for piano (1958), and subsequently in most of his instrumental compositions of the 1960s and 1970s: Invención II for string trio (1965), Invención III for harp (1967), Soli II for wind quintet (1961), Soli III for bassoon, trumpet, viola, timpani, and orchestra (1969), Soli IV for brass trio (1966), Cinco Caprichos for piano (1975), and the late orchestral works Resonancias (1964), Elatio (1967), Discovery (1969), Clio (1969), and Initium (1970–72).

== Recordings ==
Chávez made more than a handful of recordings, conducting his own music as well as that of other composers. One of the earliest was made in the 1930s for RCA Victor, containing Chávez's Sinfonía de Antígona and Sinfonía India, together with his orchestration of Dieterich Buxtehude's Chaconne in E minor: 4-disc 78-rpm set, Victor Red Seal M 503. The best-known of his discs was the Everest Records stereophonic recording of his Sinfonía India, Sinfonía de Antígona, and Sinfonía romántica, in which Chávez conducted the Stadium Symphony Orchestra, the name given to the New York Philharmonic for its summer performances in the Lewisohn Stadium. The album was originally issued in 1959 by Everest Records on LP SDBR 3029, and was reissued on CD in 1996 by Everest as EVC-9041, as well as at some point by Philips Records. In 1963 Chávez conducted the Vienna State Opera Orchestra in two recordings with pianist Eugene List for Westminster Records, both released on LP: one of his own Concerto for Piano and Orchestra (Westminster WST 17030, reissued in 1976 as Westminster Gold WGS 8324) and one of the two piano concertos by Edward MacDowell (ABC Westminster Gold WGS 8156).

In the 1950s he released two recordings on US Decca Records, on which he conducted the Orquesta Sinfónica de México. In 1951 a 10-inch mono LP was issued (Decca Gold Label DL 7512, reissued 1978 by Varèse Sarabande on side 2 of 12-inch LP ), containing his Suite from La hija de Cólquide (originally recorded in 1947 for the Mexican label Anfión and issued as a 3-disc 78 rpm set Anfión AM 4), and in 1956 Decca released an anthology, Music of Mexico, on which he conducted three of his own works, plus José Pablo Moncayo's Huapango (Decca Gold Label LP, DL9527).

He also made some recordings for Columbia Records which were issued on 78-rpm discs and on LP (Columbia 4-disc 78-rpm set M 414, reissued 1949 on Columbia 10-inch LP, Columbia ML 2080 and Mexican Columbia DCL 98, reissued on Columbia 12-inch LP, LL 1015; CBS Masterworks 3-LP set 32 31 0001 (mono)/ 32 31 002 (stereo); CBC Masterworks LP 32 11 0064; Columbia LP M32685; Odyssey LP Y 31534). In 1961 he recorded Sergei Prokofiev's Peter and the Wolf, with the Orquesta Sinfónica de México and Carlos Pellicer, narrator, released on Mexican Columbia MC 1360.

== See also ==
- Grupo de los cuatro, formed in 1935: Daniel Ayala Pérez, Salvador Contreras, Blas Galindo, and José Pablo Moncayo; all influenced by Chávez
