= Day on Fire =

- Directed by: Jay Anania
- Written by: Jay Anania
- Produced by: William Fisch; Larry Rattner; Susan R. Rodgers; Lina Todd; Daniel Sollinger
- Starring: Olympia Dukakis; Carmen Chaplin; Judy Kuhn; Alyssa Sutherland; Martin Donovan
- Release date: 2006
- Country: United states
- Language: English

Day on Fire is a 2006 American film which was produced by Lodestar Entertainment and filmed in New York City and Israel. It was written and directed by Jay Anania, stars Olympia Dukakis, Carmen Chaplin, Alyssa Sutherland and Martin Donovan and is produced by William Fisch and Larry Rattner. The film was scored by John Medeski with vocals by Judy Kuhn.

Day on Fire was screened at the 2006 Cannes Film Festival on May 22, 2006.

== Plot ==
Day on Fire tells the story of a singer, a model, an Arab woman journalist, and a physician as they criss-cross New York City over a 12-hour period. Their intersecting lives unfold against the backdrop of a ghastly suicide bombing in Israel, and the strange New York City wanderings of a malevolent Handsome Man, whose predatory intents lend an air of inevitable, horrific violence. Beautifully and hauntingly musical, this thriller also has a political and personal intrigue that mounts inexorably as the sun begins to set on this fateful day. By the time night has fallen in the city, the crossing of these individual fates is sealed. Each of these four women has found their destiny amidst the brutality that the film reveals.

== Reception ==
The film most received negative reviews. Robert Koehler of Variety wrote "...in the end, the extremely repetitive use of certain sound and images has truly diminishing returns.
