= Thomas Stewart (bass-baritone) =

American bass-baritone singer (1928–2006)

- Born: August 29, 1928; San Saba, Texas
- Died: September 24, 2006 (aged 78); Rockville, Maryland
- Occupation: Bass-baritone

Thomas Stewart (August 29, 1928 – September 24, 2006) was an American bass-baritone who sang an unusually wide range of roles, earning global acclaim particularly for his performances in Wagner's operas.

Thomas James Stewart was born in San Saba, Texas. He graduated from Baylor University in 1953 and then went to the Juilliard School, where he studied with Mack Harrell. An imposing six-footer, Stewart made his debut in 1954 as La Roche in the American premiere of Richard Strauss's Capriccio, going on to sing with the New York City Opera and Lyric Opera of Chicago.

He married soprano Evelyn Lear in 1955, and the following year the couple participated in a studio recording of Kurt Weill's Johnny Johnson, first produced in 1936. In May 1957 he created the role of Dioneo in the world premiere of Carlos Chávez's The Visitors. Later that year he and his wife traveled to Berlin on Fulbright Scholarships. In 1958 he made his major-role debut as Escamillo in Bizet's Carmen with the Städtische Opera, now the Deutsche Oper Berlin. He created the role of Jupiter in Giselher Klebe's 1961 opera Alkmene and remained on the Berlin company's roster until 1964. He debuted at the Royal Opera House in 1960, again as Escamillo, and sang frequently at Covent Garden until 1978, with roles including Golaud in Pelléas et Mélisande, Gunther in Götterdämmerung, and the title roles in Don Giovanni and The Flying Dutchman.

A regular at the Bayreuth Festival for 13 years (1960–72), Stewart sang most of Wagner's heroic baritone roles, including Wotan/Wanderer and Gunther in the Ring Cycle, the Dutchman, Wolfram in Tannhäuser, and Amfortas in Parsifal. He sang the latter role for 13 consecutive Bayreuth seasons.

In 1967 Herbert von Karajan launched the Salzburg Easter Festival with a new staging of the Ring Cycle, casting Stewart as Wotan/Wanderer and Gunther during the festival's first four seasons, and again as Wotan in a later revival of Das Rheingold. Karajan recorded all four operas from the cycle with the Texas baritone, and Time Magazine acclaimed him "the Wotan of his generation."

Stewart made his Metropolitan Opera debut as Ford in Verdi's Falstaff in 1966. Over the next decade he figured in many stage and broadcast performances as the Met's leading Wagner baritone (Wotan/Wanderer, Hans Sachs in Die Meistersinger, Kurwenal in Tristan und Isolde, Amfortas, Wolfram, the Dutchman, Gunther). He also sang a variety of other roles: Golaud, Jochanaan in Salome, Orest in Elektra, Iago in Verdi's Otello, Balstrode in Peter Grimes, the four villains in Contes d'Hoffmann, as well as Mozart's Almaviva and Don Giovanni. He returned to that house annually until 1976, then less regularly but still frequently thereafter; the Met database lists his last season with the house as 1993–94.

With the San Francisco Opera he sang the title role in the American premiere of Aribert Reimann's Lear (1981). At the same house he also sang several French and Italian roles (Golaud, Valentin in Faust, Posa in Don Carlos, both Ford and the title role in Falstaff), as well as major Wagnerian roles (Wotan/Wanderer, Gunther, Wolfram, Kurwenal, Amfortas). He received a medal from that company in 1985 for his 25 years of distinguished performance.

In his prime years Stewart also returned to Lyric Opera of Chicago to sing the Dutchman and Hans Sachs, as well as Orest, Ford, and Mozart's Almaviva. At other houses worldwide, his better-known roles also included Scarpia in Tosca, Renato in Un ballo in maschera, di Luna in Il trovatore, Amonasro in Aida, and the title roles in Rigoletto and Eugene Onegin.

In later years, he and his wife ran the Evelyn Lear and Thomas Stewart Emerging Singers Program of the Wagner Society of Washington, D.C.

Thomas Stewart died of a heart attack while playing golf near his home in Rockville, Maryland, aged 78. He was survived by his two children and his wife, who died in 2012.

== Selected discography ==
- With Herbert von Karajan: Das Rheingold (as Wotan); Die Walküre (as Wotan); Siegfried (as Der Wanderer); Götterdämmerung (as Gunther). Stewart's Rheingold Wotan was both recorded and filmed.
- With Rafael Kubelík: Die Meistersinger von Nürnberg (as Hans Sachs); Lohengrin (as Telramund); Beethoven's Symphony No. 9.
- With Karl Böhm: The Flying Dutchman (as The Dutchman); Götterdämmerung (as Gunther); Elektra (as Orest).
- With Hans Knappertsbusch: Parsifal (as Amfortas).
- With Pierre Boulez: Parsifal (as Amfortas).
- With Wolfgang Sawallisch: Elektra (as Orest).
- With Karl Richter: Samson (as Manoa); Ein deutsches Requiem.
- With Heinrich Hollreiser: Jonny spielt auf (as Daniello).
- With Kurt Eichhorn: Iphigenie in Aulis (as Kalchas); Die Kluge (as Der König).
- With Horst Stein: Highlights from Nabucco (as Nabucco); highlights from Der Evangelimann (as Johannes).
- With Evelyn Lear: American Scenes, American Poets - Songs by Charles Ives; La ci darem la mano - Opera Duets by Mozart, Verdi, Handel, and Richard Strauss; Lieder by Hugo Wolf in the composer's own orchestrations; Romantic Duets by Schubert, Brahms, Dvorak, Saint-Saëns, etc.
