= Alyssa Sutherland =

Australian actress and model

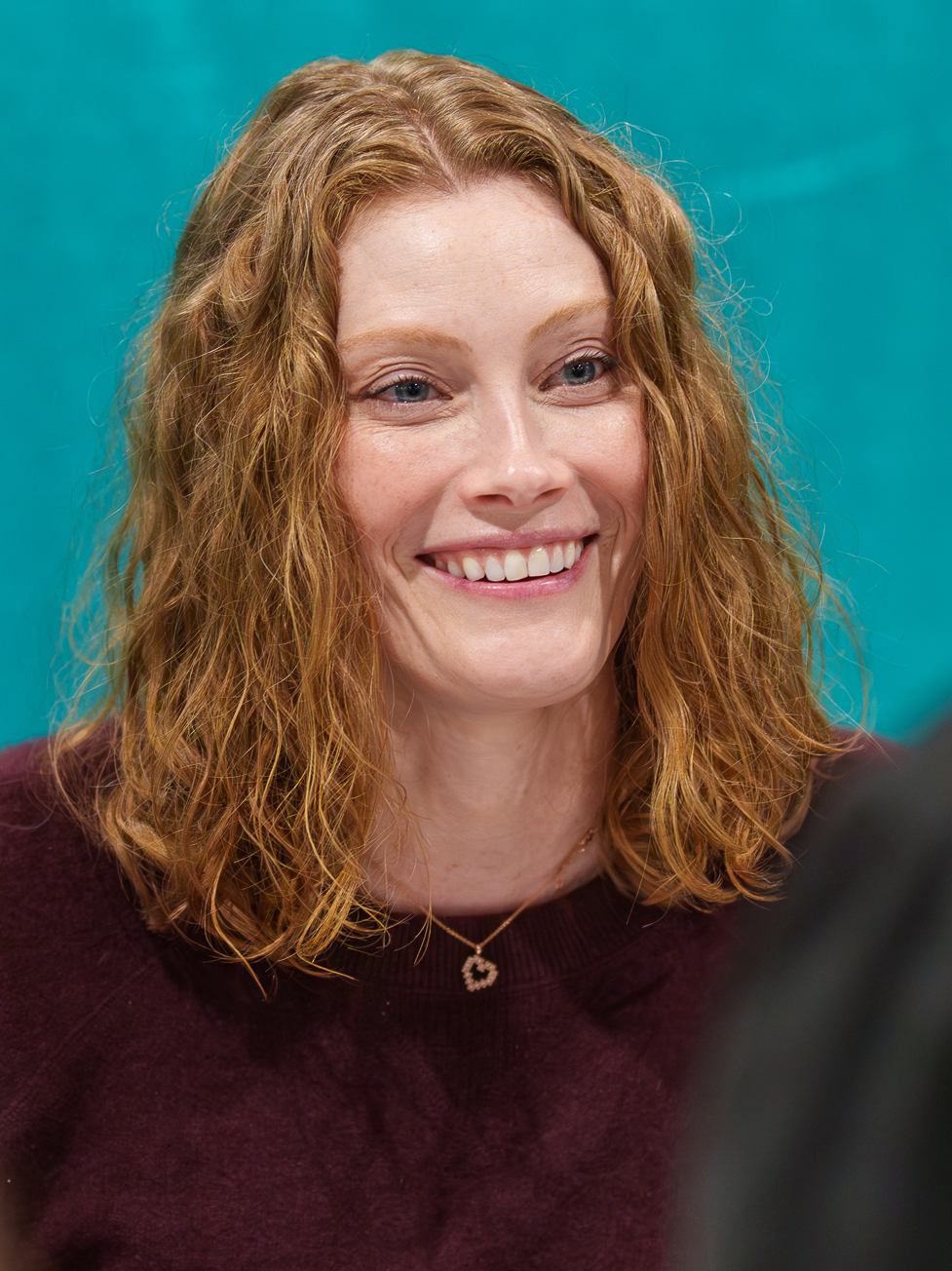
- Sutherland in 2025
- Born: 23 September 1982 (age 44); Brisbane, Queensland, Australia
- Occupations: Actress, model
- Years active: 2006–present
- Known for: Vikings (2013–2016); Evil Dead Rise (2023)
- Spouse: Laurence Shanet (m. 2012; div. 2013)
- Modelling information
- Height: 5 ft 11 in (1.80 m)
- Hair colour: Strawberry blonde
- Eye colour: Blue
- Agency: Chic Management, Next Model Management

Alyssa Sutherland (born 23 September 1982) is an Australian actress, best known for her role as Ellie in the fifth and sixth installments of the Evil Dead franchise.

== Early life ==
Sutherland was born in Brisbane where she was raised in the suburb of Chermside. She is of Scottish descent, of Clan Sutherland.

A self-confessed “science geek”, 15-year-old Sutherland initially took drama in high school before dropping it to study chemistry, with plans to study for a career in molecular biology.

== Career ==
=== Modelling ===
Sutherland's modelling career began in 1997 at the age of 15, when she was discovered by her agent in a shopping mall, at the Queensland state finals of the annual model competition for Girlfriend (an Australian teen magazine), whilst standing in the crowd. She won the Queensland title and went on to win the National Finals in December of that year. Following her win, she signed a contract with Vogue Australia, before being taken to New York to begin her international modelling career.

Sutherland has had an extensive runway, print and television modeling career, appearing in campaigns for Bulgari, Ralph Lauren, Garnier, Calvin Klein, Chanel, John Frieda, Kerastase, Hugo Boss and Abercrombie & Fitch.

Sutherland has appeared on the cover of magazines for Vogue Australia, Harper's Bazaar Singapore and Japan, Elle Germany, Australian Style, Glamour Italy and Black & White. She has also shot extensive editorial for Vogue (Germany, Australia, Italy, Greece and U.S.), Elle (Australia and U.S.), Marie-Claire (UK), Harper's Bazaar (Australia), Glamour Italy, I.D., Wallpaper* and The Face and Scene. She has worked with renowned fashion photographers, including Herb Ritts, Bruce Weber, Ellen von Unwerth and Steven Meisel.

In 2007, Sutherland became the newest Flake Girl, when Cadbury revived its iconic TV advertisements after a five-year hiatus. The advertisement shows her, in reverse time, eating a Flake bar in a convertible during a rain shower. She is one of several former Cadbury advert actors to speak out in favour of the "Keep Cadbury British" campaign in opposition to the sale of Cadbury to a non-British owner.

Since transitioning away from modeling, Sutherland has expressed guilt about having contributed to the "unrealistic standards" of beauty set by the fashion-industry and has been critical of its strict and damaging size-requirements.

=== Acting ===
A few years into her modelling career, Sutherland was asked to do a screen test for an Australian film (which didn't eventuate). She started taking acting classes and realised that was how she wanted to earn a living. Her acting career began in 2001, when she starred in Australian modelling documentary The Walk. She also appeared in the music video for Lenny Kravitz' single "Where Are We Runnin'?" in 2004.

After joining a talent agency, Sutherland then landed a small role in 2006 film The Devil Wears Prada, alongside Meryl Streep and Anne Hathaway. That same year, she played Shira, a model, in Day on Fire with Olympia Dukakis. She next played the role of Claire in 2009 horror film Don’t Look Up. She also had a small part in 2012 crime drama film Arbitrage, starring Richard Gere and Susan Sarandon.

Sutherland landed the role of Princess Aslaug, second wife of Ragnar Lothbrok (played by Travis Fimmel) in historic drama series Vikings. She joined the cast from the final episode of the first season in 2013, appearing through to season four in 2016, when she was shot in the back and killed by Lagertha (Katheryn Winnick).

In 2017, Sutherland played the lead role of Eve Copeland in The Mist, a miniseries adaptation of Stephen King’s sci-fi horror 1985 novella of the same name. The following year, she played Hedy Lamarr in an episode of NBC sci-fi drama series Timeless. She then starred in 2019 Australian survival horror/thriller Blood Vessel, which was filmed in Melbourne. It premiered on closing night at 2019 FilmQuest in Provo, Utah, where Sutherland won the award for Best Supporting Actress.

Sutherland returned to Australia again to star in Goalpost Pictures’ gold rush drama miniseries New Gold Mountain, playing the role of Belle Roberts, a widow overcoming the trauma of an abusive marriage in 1850s Australia. The series was filmed at Sovereign Hill, outside Melbourne and premiered on SBS on 13 October 2021. Collectively, the cast won Outstanding Performance by an Ensemble in a Miniseries or Telemovie at the 2022 Equity Ensemble Awards.

In May 2021, Sutherland was cast in the 2023 horror film Evil Dead Rise as Ellie Bixler, the possessed Deadite later known as 'The Marauder'. Her portrayal won her Best Supporting Performance at the Fangoria Chainsaw Awards in 2024, and saw her nominated for Best Actress in a Horror Movie at the Critics' Choice Super Awards, the same year.

In 2026, Sutherland reprised her role as Ellie in Evil Dead Burn, with a cameo appearance seeing her character revived in the post-credits scene.

== Personal life ==
On 5 February 2012, Sutherland married her longtime boyfriend Laurence Shanet at Natai Beach, in Thailand. The couple divorced in November 2013.

== Filmography ==
=== Film ===
Year	Title	Role	Notes	Ref
2006	The Devil Wears Prada	Clacker		
2006	Day on Fire	Shira		
2009	Don't Look Up	Claire		
2012	Arbitrage	Jeffrey's Receptionist		
2013	The Fortune Theory	Delilah Heinz		
2019	Blood Vessel	Jane Prescott		
2023	Evil Dead Rise	Ellie 'Elle' Bixler		
2023	The Mental State	Dana Cady		
2026	Evil Dead Burn	Ellie 'Elle' Bixler	Cameo appearance	
2026	The Room Below	Mia Levine		

=== Television ===
Year	Title	Role	Notes	Ref
2008	New Amsterdam	Alice	Episode: "Legacy"	
2008	Huge	Izzy	Unsold TV pilot	
2011, 2019	Law & Order: Special Victims Unit	Kate	Episode: "Bang"	
2011, 2019	Law & Order: Special Victims Unit	Sadie Parker	Episode: "Plastic"	
2013–2016	Vikings	Aslaug	Main role; 35 episodes (seasons 1–4)	
2015	Australia's Next Top Model	Herself	Episode: "Finale"	
2017	The Mist	Eve Copeland	Main role; 10 episodes	
2018	Timeless	Hedy Lamarr	Episode: "Hollywoodland"	
2021	New Gold Mountain	Belle Roberts	Miniseries; 4 episodes	

== Awards ==
Year	Work	Award	Category	Result	Ref
2019	Blood Vessel	FilmQuest Awards	Best Supporting Actress in a Feature	Won	
2022	New Gold Mountain	Equity Ensemble Awards	Outstanding Performance by an Ensemble in a Miniseries or Telemovie	Won	
2024	Evil Dead Rise	Fangoria Chainsaw Awards	Best Supporting Performance	Won	
2024	Evil Dead Rise	iHorror Awards	Best Actress	Won	
2024	Evil Dead Rise	Critics' Choice Super Awards	Best Actress in a Horror Movie	Nominated	
