= Take Away (film) =

- Directed by: Marc Gracie
- Written by: Dave O'Neil; Mark O'Toole
- Produced by: Marc Gracie; David Redman
- Starring: Vince Colosimo; Stephen Curry; Rose Byrne; John Howard; Nathan Phillips
- Production company: Macquarie Film Corporation
- Release date: 14 August 2003
- Running time: 88 minutes
- Country: Australia
- Language: English

Take Away is a 2003 Australian comedy film, written by Dave O'Neil, who also features as a minor character, and Mark O'Toole. It stars Vince Colosimo, Stephen Curry, Rose Byrne, John Howard and Nathan Phillips. The film starts in 19th century Victoria with the invention of the ever great "Take away".

== Cast ==
- Vince Colosimo as Tony Stilano
- Stephen Curry as Trev Spackneys
- Rose Byrne as Sonja Stilano
- John Howard as Burgies CEO
- Nathan Phillips as Dave
- Nicholas Bell as Squire
- Michael Veitch as Barry Burgie
- Brett Swain as Kenny Yallop

== Plot ==
Tony Stilano and Trev Spackneys both own, live over and work in adjoining take-away fish and chip shops in Melbourne. Although they have fallen into a habitual rivalry based on a cause long forgotten, the pair unite when the multinational fast-food outlet "Burgies" unveils a new store directly opposite the twin fish and chips shops.

Stilano (portrayed by Vince Colosimo) is an uptight store runner, demanding everything be in order including his drinks and food that are safe to consume – the coldest must always be at the front and preparing the food in a professional way. Spackneys (played by Stephen Curry), however is the opposite. His chips are made of dirty potatoes and he could not care less about health or safety precautions. Both owners are aided by their two romantically linked apprentices. Sonja Stilano (Tony's cousin, played by Rose Byrne) and Dave (played by Nathan Phillips).

== Filming locations ==
The set of the take-away store was constructed opposite the Alphington railway station on Wingrove Street in Alphington, Victoria. Other parts of the movie were also filmed in the upcoming suburb of Northcote, Melbourne, including the old AMF Bowling, and the Northcote YMCA. The set was demolished after filming was complete. The land was since subdivided with new houses built.

== Box office ==
Take Away grossed $927,582 at the box office in Australia.

== See also ==
- Cinema of Australia
