= Gracie's Choice =

2004 made-for-television drama film directed by Peter Werner

- DVD cover
- Based on: "A Lifelong Fight" by Rena Dictor LeBlanc
- Written by: Joyce Eliason
- Directed by: Peter Werner
- Starring: Kristen Bell; Diane Ladd; Shedrack Anderson; Anne Heche; Roberta Maxwell; Kristin Fairlie
- Music by: Richard Marvin
- Countries of origin: Canada; United States
- Original language: English

Production
- Producer: Randy Sutter
- Cinematography: Neil Roach
- Editor: Martin Nicholson
- Running time: 91 minutes

Original release
- Network: Lifetime
- Release: January 12, 2004

Gracie's Choice: A Story of Love is a 2004 American drama film that premiered on Lifetime on January 12, 2004. It is written by Joyce Eliason; directed by Peter Werner; and stars Kristen Bell, Anne Heche, Diane Ladd, and Kristin Fairlie.

== Plot ==
Gracie is a 17-year-old girl whose mother, Rowena, is addicted to drugs. The police arrest Rowena and separate the children into foster care, forcing them to leave their family dog Spike behind. Gracie struggles to keep her sister and three brothers together. Their mother is in and out of their lives, dating multiple men. Her sister gets pregnant and runs off to get married, so Gracie takes on the challenge of being the primary caregiver and guardian to her brothers while putting herself through school and working part time.

Gracie is pushed over the edge when one of Rowena's boyfriends, Ray, tries to sexually assault Gracie in the kitchen of their house while Rowena is passed out on the bed from drinking too much. When Rowena wakes up to see what was going on, Ray lies and says Gracie was coming onto him.

One night, Gracie and Robbie are at their local convenience store and get into a cross-fire between two rival gangs. Their rearview mirror, windshield and one of their tires are shot out during the cross-fire.

At Gracie's high school graduation, Tommy (Gracie's boyfriend) finds out Gracie got accepted into Braxton College, but didn't tell him about it. Tommy, tired of Gracie choosing her brothers over their relationship, breaks up with her.

Eventually, Gracie decides that in order to keep the family stable and away from their mother's errant ways, she must petition to adopt her three brothers, Ryan, Jonny, and Robbie in court. She does so but not without a fight from her mother. Ultimately the judge asks each individual boy who they want to live with, and all three say Gracie despite their mother's pleas. Seeing the stability the boys have found with their sister and taking into account the answers she was given, the judge terminates parental rights of their mother and grants them to Gracie. The trial ends with them adopting the surname of "Weatherly" from all the trials they have weathered, and the story ends with details about how well the new family is doing.

Gracie is busy being a full-time mother and has a full-time job while maintaining a 3.9 GPA. Ryan and Jonny are doing great in school, and Robbie wants to be a judge when he grows up.

== Cast ==
- Kristen Bell as Gracie Thompson
- Anne Heche as Rowena Lawson
- Diane Ladd as Louela Lawson
- Shedrack Anderson as Tommy
- Roberta Maxwell as Judge
- Kristin Fairlie as Rose Carlton
- Brian Akins as Ryan Walker
- David Gibson McLean as Jonny Blicker
- Jack Armstrong as Robbie Locascio
- Robert Seeliger as Ray
- Sandra Caldwell as Mrs. Thurston

== Production notes ==
Inspired by actual events, the film is based on a story featured in the September 2000 issue of Reader's Digest from staff writer Rena Dictor LeBlanc, about a girl named Amy Waldroop who raises her family after she loses custody of her drug addicted mother and is described as being "sure to touch your heart".

== Reception ==
Gracie's Choice received generally positive reviews, with critics praising the acting, story, characters, emotional weight, and both Bell and Heche's performances. Heche was nominated for the 2004 Emmy Award for "Outstanding Supporting Actress in a Miniseries or a Movie".
