= Sylvia Stahlman =

American soprano (1929–1998)

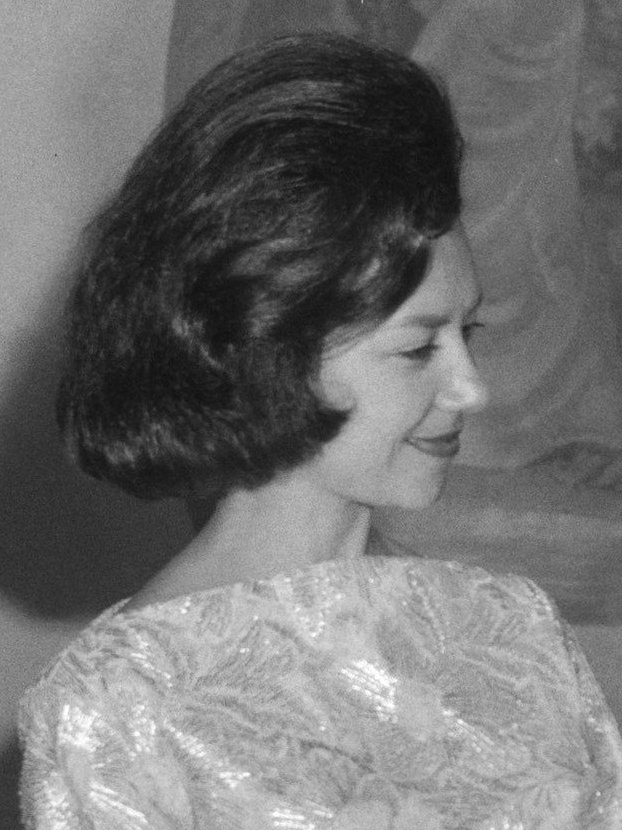
Stahlman in the Netherlands in 1963

Sylvia Stahlman (March 5, 1929 – August 19, 1998) was an American soprano, particularly associated with light, coloratura roles.

== Career ==
Stahlman was born in Nashville, Tennessee, and studied at the Juilliard School in New York City. She began her career on Broadway, in 1948-49, in Kurt Weill's Love Life, opposite Nanette Fabray, directed by Elia Kazan.

She left for Europe to begin a career in opera, performing first under the name Giulia Bardi. She made her debut at La Monnaie in Brussels, as Elvira in I puritani, in 1951, and remained with that theatre until 1954. She also sang in Amsterdam, Frankfurt, and Vienna, and appeared at the Glyndebourne Festival in 1959, as Ilia in Idomeneo.

In America, she appeared at the New York City Opera in the fall season of 1956, as Eurydice in Orphée aux enfers, conducted by Erich Leinsdorf, and Gilda in Rigoletto, with Julius Rudel conducting. In 1957 she created the role of Lauretta in the world premiere of Carlos Chávez's The Visitors. The soprano also appeared at the San Francisco Opera and the Lyric Opera of Chicago. In San Francisco, she sang Sophie in Der Rosenkavalier, Sister Constance of St Dénis in Dialogues des Carmélites (the United States premiere), Oscar in Un ballo in maschera (to the Amelia of Herva Nelli), Lauretta in Gianni Schicchi, and Dircé in Médée (the Italian version), from 1957 to 1960. In 1963, she sang one of the Flower-maidens in Parsifal, at the Bayreuth Festival. She also took part, in 1964, in the American premiere of Daphne, at the Santa Fe Opera.

Excelling in coloratura and soubrette roles, she can be heard on recordings, in Un ballo in maschera, opposite Birgit Nilsson, Giulietta Simionato, Carlo Bergonzi, and Cornell MacNeil, under Sir Georg Solti (1960–61), and as Lisa in La sonnambula, with Dame Joan Sutherland (1962). In 1964, Stahlman recorded excerpts from Fidelio (as Marzelline), opposite Anja Silja.

Stahlman died in St. Petersburg, Florida.
