= Stefan Schneider (ice hockey, born 1975) =

Swiss ice hockey player

- Born: July 11, 1975 (age 49)
- Height: 5 ft 10 in (178 cm)
- Weight: 179 lb (81 kg; 12 st 11 lb)
- Position: Defence
- Played for: NLA; SC Bern (1993-95); Lausanne HC (1995-96)
- NHL draft: Undrafted
- Playing career: 1993–2000

Stefan Schneider (born July 11, 1975) is a Swiss former professional ice hockey defenceman who played in the Swiss National League A with SC Bern (1993–94, 1994–95, and 1998–99) and Lausanne HC (1995–96).

He is currently the head coach of Unterseen-Interlaken in the Switzerland3.
