= Nina Liu =

Australian actress

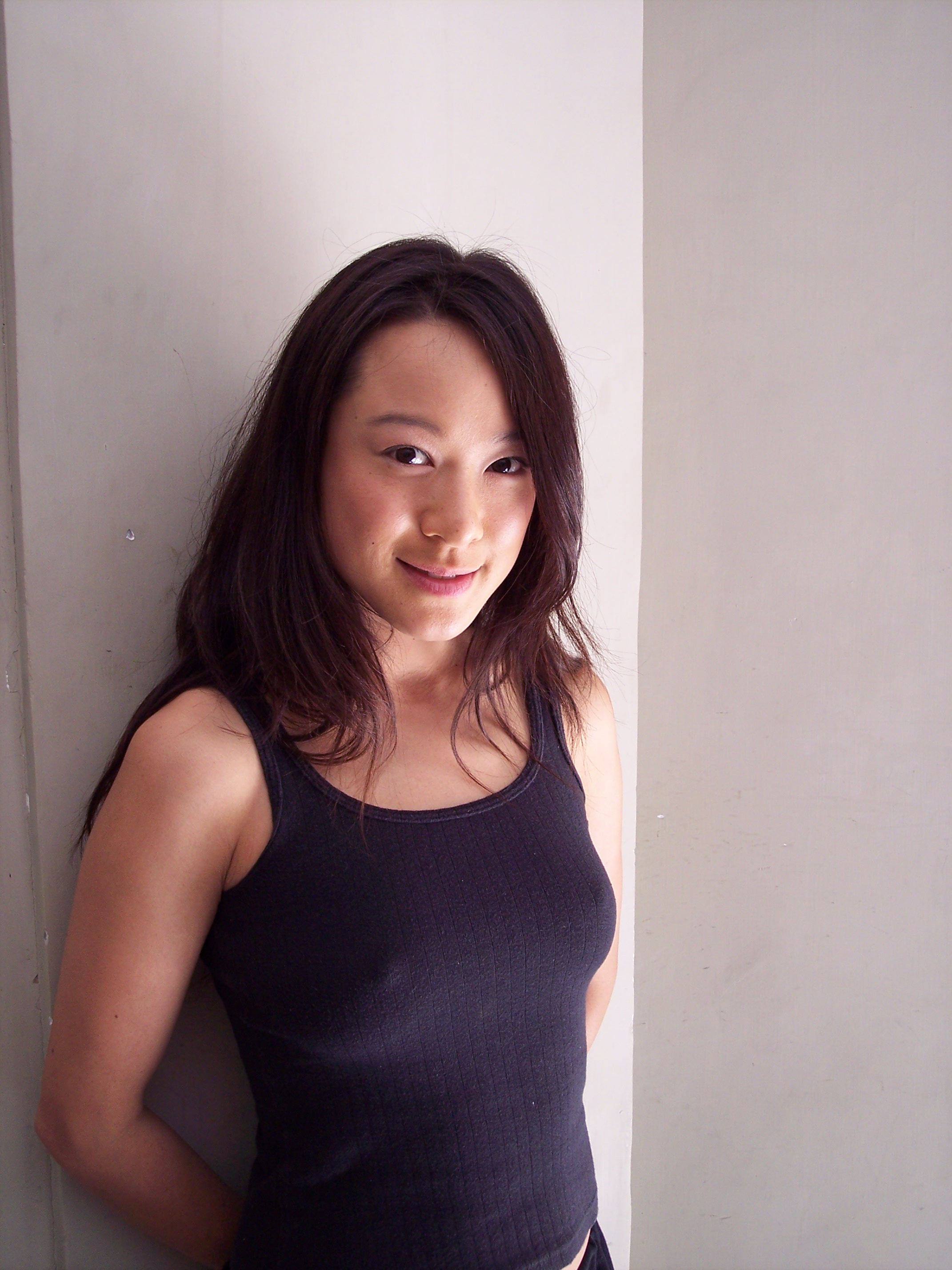
- Nina in Beijing
- Born: 15 June 1977 (age 49); Sydney, Australia
- Education: Western Australian Academy Of Performing Arts (WAAPA) (1999–2002)
- Occupation: Actress
- Years active: 1995-present
- Known for: The Secret Life of Us; Little Fish
- Spouse: Axel Schweitzer (m. 2008)

Nina Liu (born 15 June 1977) is an Australian actress of Chinese descent. She played Chloe in the television series The Secret Life of Us.

== Early life and education ==
Liu studied acting at Western Australian Academy Of Performing Arts (WAAPA) from 1999 to 2002.

== Career ==
Liu has starred in several TV series, including the first season of Spellbinder as Lia, the fifth season of Heartbreak High as Mai Hem, Something in the Air, as Dr Annie Young, the third season of The Secret Life of Us as Chloe and in Shaun Micallef's legal comedy Welcher & Welcher as Tia the receptionist. She has also made guest appearances in Big Sky, Wildside and Water Rats.

She has had roles in the Australian films Little Fish (2005) alongside Cate Blanchett and Sam Neill, and The Book of Revelation (2006). She also appeared in the docu-drama Super Comet: After the Impact which aired on the Discovery Channel in 2007.

Liu currently lives in Berlin where she has appeared in several German films.

== Filmography ==
=== Film ===
Year	Title	Role	Type
1996	Floating Life	Apple	Feature film
1999	Liu Awaiting Spring	Anna, age 16	Short film
2002	Warriors of Virtue: The Return to Tao	Amythis	Feature film
2005	Little Fish	Mai	Feature film
2006	The Book of Revelation	Vivian	Feature film
2006	Armageddon - Die längste Nacht		
2007	Super Comet: After the Impact (aka Armageddon - Der Einschlag or Armageddon - Die längste Nacht)	Shiang	Docudrama
2007	Hippie Hippie Shake	Jenny Kee	Feature film
2008	Mamas Flitterwochen	Mai Ling	TV movie
2009	Am Seidenen Faden	Mutter	Short film
2012	Jahr des Drachen (aka Year of the Dragon)	Huong	TV movie
2013	Exterritorial	Joanna	TV movie

=== Television ===
Year	Title	Role	Type
1995–96	Spellbinder	Lisa	7 episodes
1996	Naked: Stories of Men	Mai	Miniseries, episode 4: "Ghost Story"
1997	Heartbreak High	Mai Hem	Seasons 5–6, 49 episodes
1997	Big Sky	Jasmina	Season 1, episode 39: "Just Between Us"
1999	Wildside	Teresa	Season 2, episode 20
2001–02	Something in the Air	Dr Annie Young	Season 1, 160 episodes
2003	Welcher & Welcher	Tia	Miniseries, 8 episodes
2003	The Secret Life of Us	Chloe	Season 3, 22 episodes
2007	Verrückt nach Clara	Miu	
