= Blood Vessel (2019 film) =

2019 horror film

- Directed by: Justin Dix
- Written by: Justin Dix; Jordan Prosser
- Produced by: Corey Trent Ackerman; William Byerley; Justin Dix; Matthew Graham; Jeff Harrison; Charmaine Kuhn; Steven Matusko; Steven McKinnon; Nathan Phillips; Silvio Salom; Veronica Sive; Brett Thornquest
- Starring: Alyssa Sutherland; Robert Taylor; Nathan Phillips; Christopher Kirby; John Lloyd Fillingham; Alex Cooke
- Cinematography: Sky Davies
- Edited by: David Redman
- Music by: Brian Cachia
- Production companies: Storm Vision Entertainment; SunJive Studios; Wicked of Oz Studios
- Distributed by: Shaw Organisation; Entertainment Squad; The Horror Collective; Umbrella Entertainment
- Release date: 2019
- Running time: 93 minutes
- Country: Australia
- Language: English

Blood Vessel is a 2019 horror film that was filmed in Melbourne, Australia. The film was directed by Justin Dix and written by Dix and Jordan Prosser. It stars Alyssa Sutherland, Robert Taylor, Nathan Phillips, Christopher Kirby, John Lloyd Fillingham, and Alex Cooke. The film premiered as a closing night film at 2019 FilmQuest in Provo, Utah, where it was nominated for eleven awards, winning for Best Art Department, Best Costume, and Best Supporting Actress for Sutherland. The film was released on 21 July 2020 via video-on-demand service Shudder.

== Plot ==
In late 1945, near the end of World War II, a life raft is adrift in the North Atlantic, carrying the survivors of a hospital ship that was hit by a German torpedo and sunk. The survivors - American cook Bigelow, American mechanic Jackson, British nurse Jane Prescott, British codebreaker Gerard Faraday, Australian soldier Sinclair, Russian sniper Alexander Teplov, and Malone, the American captain of the hospital ship - have been adrift for days and have run out of food when suddenly a Nazi minesweeper drifts by. The group board the passing ship but Malone falls while climbing up and is killed by the ship's propellers. The remaining survivors investigate the seemingly-abandoned ship, with Sinclair, Teplov, and Bigelow going to the bridge and finding the steering wheel chained in place, along with the mutilated body of one of the ship's German crew. Below deck, Jackson checks out the engine and finds bodies that seem to have been burned to death, and also discovers that the boiler has failed and the ship could explode at any time if the engine keeps running, so he shuts off the engine, leaving the ship dead in the water.

The survivors discover a young girl hiding in the galley who reflexively bites Jane out of fear, but they calm her down and she, speaking Romanian, introduces herself as Mya. Mya leads the survivors to a heavy locked door further below deck. They open it and discover a surviving German crew member who becomes terrified at the sight of Mya and tries to kill her with his Luger, accidentally killing Jackson; Teplov then kills the German. Bigelow and Sinclair investigate the room that the German survivor was holed up in and find multiple large wooden boxes, a box of gold, and a box filled with crucifixes and transparent glass containers shaped like grenades that are filled with water. They then investigate the quarters of the ship's dead captain, finding a wealth of photographs and documents showing Nazi soldiers unearthing ancient artifacts, including what appear to be multiple sarcophagi, along with a thick tome showing images of monstrous creatures. Bigelow goes back to the storage room to steal some of the gold, and also opens up one of the large wooden boxes, which contains one of the sarcophagi from the photographs. He breaks the chains holding it shut and opens it looking for more treasure, but instead finds a slumbering creature with a bat-like face. The creature suddenly awakens and kills Bigelow; Sinclair encounters the creature as it attacks Bigelow but manages to lock the storage room door, trapping it inside. The creature's awakening triggers a transformation in Mya, who is revealed to be of the same species; she suddenly attacks Jane, but Teplov shoots her, scaring her off.

Faraday sneaks away and makes contact with a German over the ship's radio and offers up classified British information in exchange for rescue, but is attacked by Mya. Sinclair, Teplov, and Jane look over the documents and film in the captain's cabin, and when Teplov looks at the tome, he recognizes the monsters depicted inside as Strigoi, fairytale creatures that are said to feed on the blood of their victims and have the power to shape-shift and command the minds of others. In the storage room, the male strigoi opens the second sarcophagus and awakens the female strigoi sleeping within. Sinclair, Teplov, and Jane find Faraday, who has been bitten by Mya, which allows the Patriarch of the strigoi to psychically control him. The survivors manage to kill the possessed Farady and then lure Mya into a trap in a gasoline-filled room, burning her to death. As she burns, the Patriarch initiates a psychic connection with Jane through the small bite she received when they first discovered Mya, which has slowly been growing worse. The Patriarch controls Jane and forces her to free him and the Matriarch from the storage room; he then bites Jane's neck.

Teplov goes back to the storage room to arm himself with the holy weapons stored there, but is ambushed by the Patriarch and bitten in the neck. He manages to escape and find Sinclair, who is being attacked by the Matriarch, but Teplov saves him with a flare gun recovered from the captain's cabin and together they kill her by decapitating her with an axe. The pair hear a distant ship approaching, alerted by the flare gun, so they agree to find Jane and then destroy the Nazi ship by detonating a warhead in the munitions storage in order to kill the Patriarch. They go to the munitions room and find it full of infected German crew, but they fight through the strigoi and kill them all. Teplov then reveals his neck wound from the Patriarch and decides to stay behind to detonate the warhead himself, ordering Sinclair to escape with Jane. Sinclair finds Jane, who appears disoriented and tells Sinclair to leave her behind, but he ignores her pleading. Teplov is attacked by the Patriarch while attempting to detonate the warhead, but protects himself with a crucifix and successfully sets off a chain of explosions across the ship, sacrificing himself and killing the Patriarch as Sinclair and Jane jump overboard. Sinclair dives underwater to rescue Jane, and begins yelling and waving at the approaching British ship, but when Jane regains consciousness, she is revealed to have been infected by the Patriarch, and bites Sinclair's neck, killing him and then letting him sink into the ocean. Jane then hides her infection and allows herself to be rescued by the unaware British sailors.
