= Catherine Littlefield =

American ballerina, choreographer, and director (1905–1951)

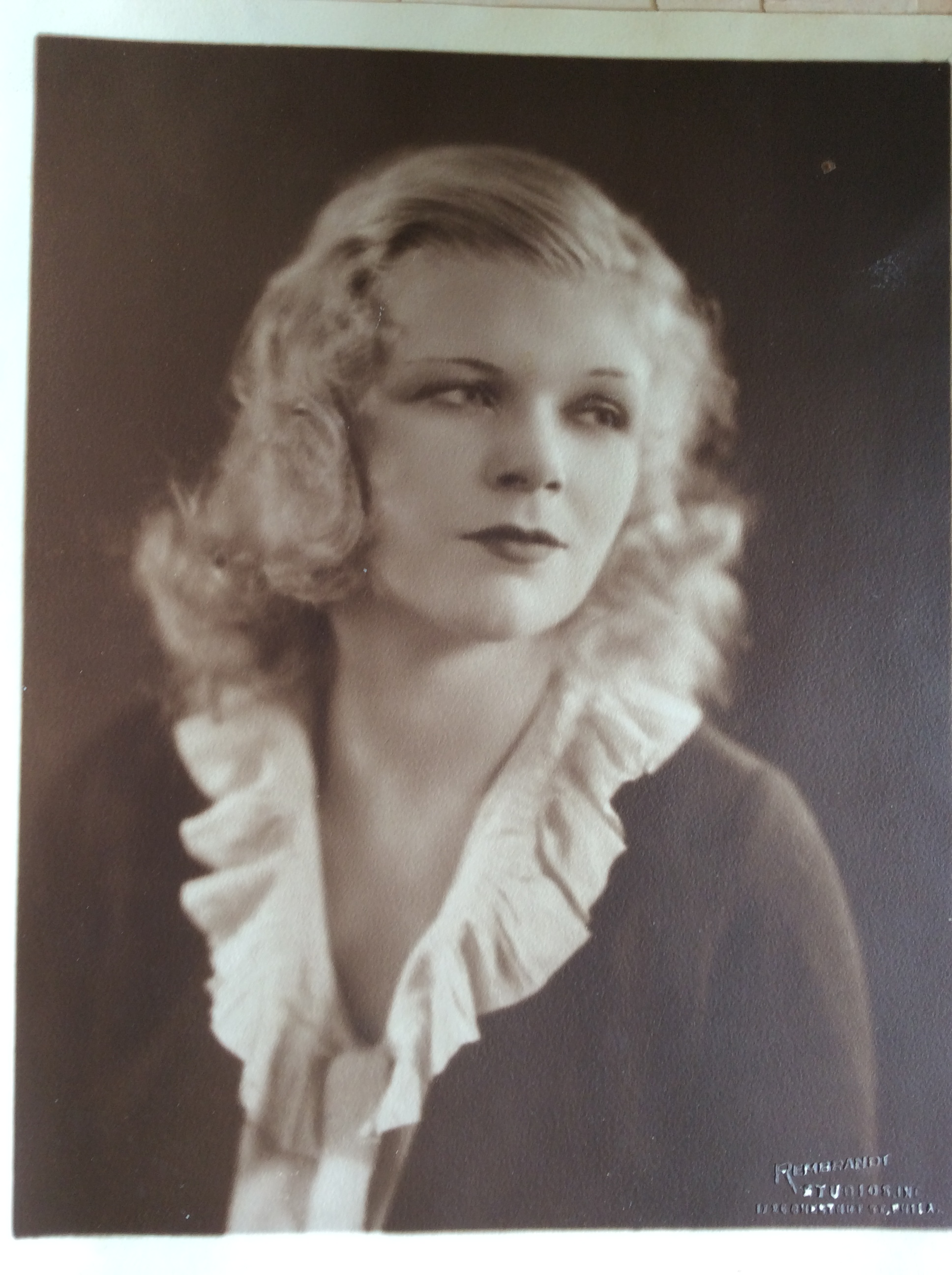
- Born: September 16, 1905; Philadelphia, Pennsylvania, U.S.
- Died: November 19, 1951 (aged 46)
- Occupations: Ballerina; choreographer
- Known for: Founder and director of the Philadelphia Ballet Company
- Spouse(s): Philip Ludwell Leidy (1933–1946), Sterling Noel (1947-1951)
- Parent(s): James and Caroline Littlefield

Catherine Littlefield (September 16, 1905 – November 19, 1951) was an American ballet dancer, choreographer, ballet teacher, and director.

She founded the Philadelphia Ballet (originally the Littlefield Ballet) in Philadelphia in 1935. It was the first American ballet company to tour Europe and the first to present a full-length (or three-act plus prologue) version of The Sleeping Beauty in the United States. In addition to producing American-themed ballets such as Barn Dance, Terminal, Cafe Society and Ladies' Better Dresses, Littlefield choreographed Broadway musicals and Sonja Henie's professional ice skating shows. She was among the first class of inductees (1987) into the National Museum of Dance and Hall of Fame.

== Early life ==
Littlefield was born in a Philadelphia rowhome in 1905 to James H. Littlefield and Caroline Doebele Littlefield (also known as "Mommie"). Her father was a native of Maine who worked for the YMCA and later founded a newsreel business. Her mother was raised by her German immigrant grandmother and studied piano at a local conservatory.

Littlefield had three younger siblings: Jimmie (b. 1910), Dorothie (b. 1912), and Carl (b. 1915). In 1908, Mommie began giving three-year-old Littlefield and neighborhood children dancing lessons at a West Philadelphia YMCA. In addition, she managed a "kiddie" opera troupe along with her husband. Actress and singer Jeanette MacDonald and Ziegfeld Follies star Ann Pennington were members of this troupe as young girls. As a preteen, Littlefield studied with C. Ellwood Carpenter, a third-generation member of a famous family of Philadelphia dancing masters. Under Carpenter's tutelage, Littlefield performed in stand-alone ballets and semi-professional opera performances. Carpenter also had a studio on the Ocean City, New Jersey, boardwalk, and Littlefield took classes with him there during summers when her father worked as a lifeguard. After the Littlefield family moved from Philadelphia to suburban Llanerch, Mommie opened a dance studio on the second floor of the Llanerch Firehouse. While Mommie nurtured her children's interest in music and dance, Littlefield's father encouraged their natural athleticism. He taught them horsemanship and acrobatic stunts, and coached Carl in long-distance swimming. Both of Littlefield's parents were gregarious and fun-loving, and the family was known to be sociable and close-knit.

== Early career ==
At age 15, Littlefield was spotted by impresario Florenz Ziegfeld as she danced in the Philadelphia Junior League's presentation of Why Not? He offered her a role in his Broadway hit Sally, and she moved to New York to join the show in the fall of 1920. Littlefield danced in various Ziegfeld productions for the next five years, eventually assuming solo roles and even a singing part. She appeared in the Follies, Annie Dear, and Louie the 14th. While in New York, she studied ballet with Luigi Albertieri and Ivan Tarasoff, becoming familiar with both Italian and Russian techniques.

While Littlefield was away, Mommie was hired to teach and stage recitals for the Philadelphia Music Club, an amateur women's musical group. This led to her appointment as ballet mistress for the Philadelphia Civic Opera and later the Philadelphia Grand Opera. Littlefield returned to Philadelphia from New York to dance lead roles for her mother. She also choreographed ballets and opera divertissements under her mother's name. By this time, Mommie's dancing studio had evolved into the full-fledged Littlefield School, and the Littlefields used their advanced students in their productions. They also hired several men, including William Dollar, to teach and perform. Zelda Fitzgerald, wife of novelist F. Scott Fitzgerald, studied with Littlefield in 1927 and wrote a short story about her. The story was never published and the manuscript was subsequently lost.

In the late 1920s and early 1930s, Littlefield staged prologues and line shows at movie palaces around the city, including at the opulent Stanley and Mastbaum theaters. During this period, she traveled to Paris almost annually to train with Russian expatriate teachers, particularly Lyubov Yegorova. Mommie and Littlefield's sister, Dorothie, who was also a dancer, often accompanied her. In Paris, Littlefield became friendly with Lucienne Lamballe, the etoile of the Paris Opera ballet, and George Balanchine, the Russian choreographer and eventual founder of the New York City Ballet.

In 1932, Littlefield choreographed her first attributed work, called H.P. (Horsepower). Composed by Carlos Chavez and designed by Mexican muralist Diego Rivera, it concerned the relationship between the United States and Mexico, a fashionable subject at the time. It drew a glittering audience and enormous publicity but didn't fare well with the critics and was never repeated.

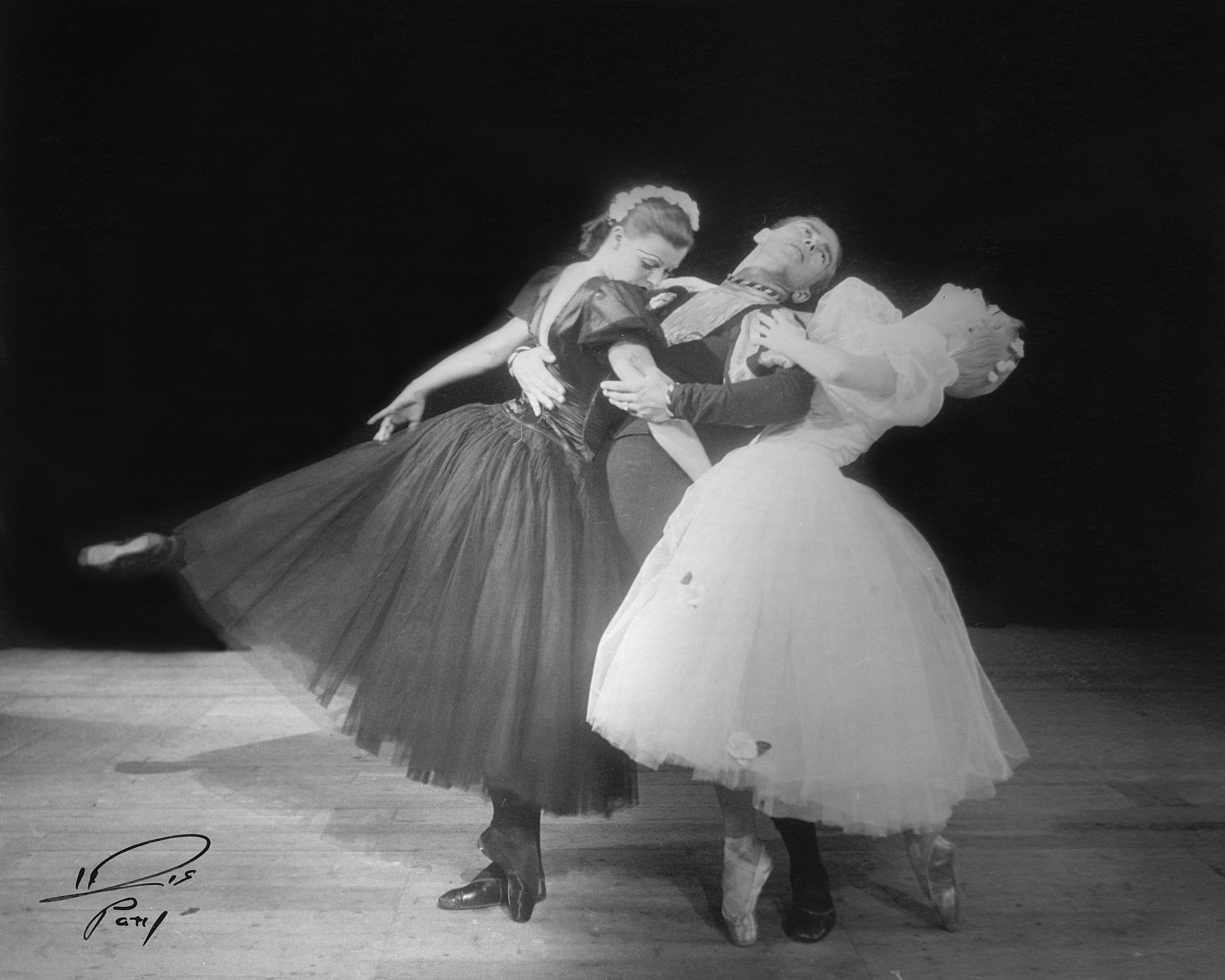

== Mid-career/Philadelphia Ballet ==
After a brief stint as ballet mistress at New York's Roxy Theatre, Littlefield returned home and married Philadelphia lawyer/socialite Philip Ludwell Leidy. With Leidy's financial support, she started organizing a professional ballet troupe, which had long been a dream of hers. In the meantime, her friend Balanchine had arrived in New York from Europe to establish a school and company under the sponsorship of Lincoln Kirstein. Balanchine needed dancers and visited the Littlefield School to hold auditions, eventually offering scholarships to a half dozen of Littlefield's best students. These girls left for New York, accompanied by Littlefield's sister, Dorothie, whom Balanchine hired to teach, dance, and serve as ballet mistress for his incipient School of American Ballet and first company, called the American Ballet. Despite the loss of these dancers, Littlefield followed through with her own plans to form a troupe. The Littlefield Ballet gave its inaugural performance at Haverford High School on October 25, 1935. Two months later, Littlefield changed the company's name to the Philadelphia Ballet. She served as its director, choreographer, and premiere danseuse, while Dorothie (who had left Balanchine's employ to help her sister) and Littlefield's brother Carl, who had been convinced by Mommie to learn dancing, joined as soloists. Mommie was the company's rehearsal pianist and musical director. Most of the company's dancers were Philadelphia teenagers who had studied at the Littlefield School.

During the Philadelphia Ballet's six-year existence, it presented a wide range of works: a three-act Sleeping Beauty and a three-act Daphnis and Chloe; ballets with American subjects and music such as Barn Dance, Terminal, Cafe Society, and Ladies' Better Dresses; one-act narrative pieces such as The Minstrel, The Snow Maiden, and Viennese Waltz; a plotless one act called Classical Suite to music by Johann Sebastian Bach; an annual Christmas Die Puppenfee; and historical pageants such as The Rising Sun and Let the Righteous Be Glad. Although Littlefield choreographed most of the company's repertoire, she also presented works by other choreographers including her Russian ballet master Alexis Dolinoff and modern dancer Lasar Galpern. Littlefield was an excellent ballerina herself, known for her clean unmannered style. "Ethereal" was the word most often used to describe her dancing. Dorothie, on the other hand, was a lyrical, athletic ballerina with great technical capabilities. Dorothie's former student, Barbara Weisberger. who later founded the Pennsylvania Ballet, remarked: "There was nothing Dorothie could not do." Carl was naturally gifted and shone in both classical and comic roles. Besides Littlefield and her siblings, the Philadelphia Ballet's leading dancers included Dolinoff, Thomas Cannon, Karen Conrad, Joan McCracken, Miriam Golden, Dania Krupska, and Norma Gentner. Conrad and Golden eventually left the company to become original members of Ballet Theatre (later American Ballet Theatre).

The Philadelphia Ballet was the first classical ballet company to tour Europe. In the spring and summer of 1937, the company performed to critical and audience acclaim in Paris, Brussels, London, and Deauville, France. Littlefield's American-themed works Barn Dance and Terminal proved especially popular with European audiences. Esteemed British critic Arnold Haskell declared that Littlefield's "Barn Dance [was] the first chapter in the history of American Ballet." Indeed, Barn Dance was the first highly successful and widely seen work of "ballet Americana," in which the theme, designs, music, and dancers were entirely American or American made.

Following the European tour, the company reverted to its original name—the Littlefield Ballet—to dance for three seasons in Chicago as the resident troupe of the Chicago Civic Opera company. It also undertook an eight-week domestic tour in early 1941, performing in college towns and at the Ohio State Fair. The company disbanded soon after the attack on Pearl Harbor, when many of Littlefield's male dancers enlisted in the American military.

== Late career ==
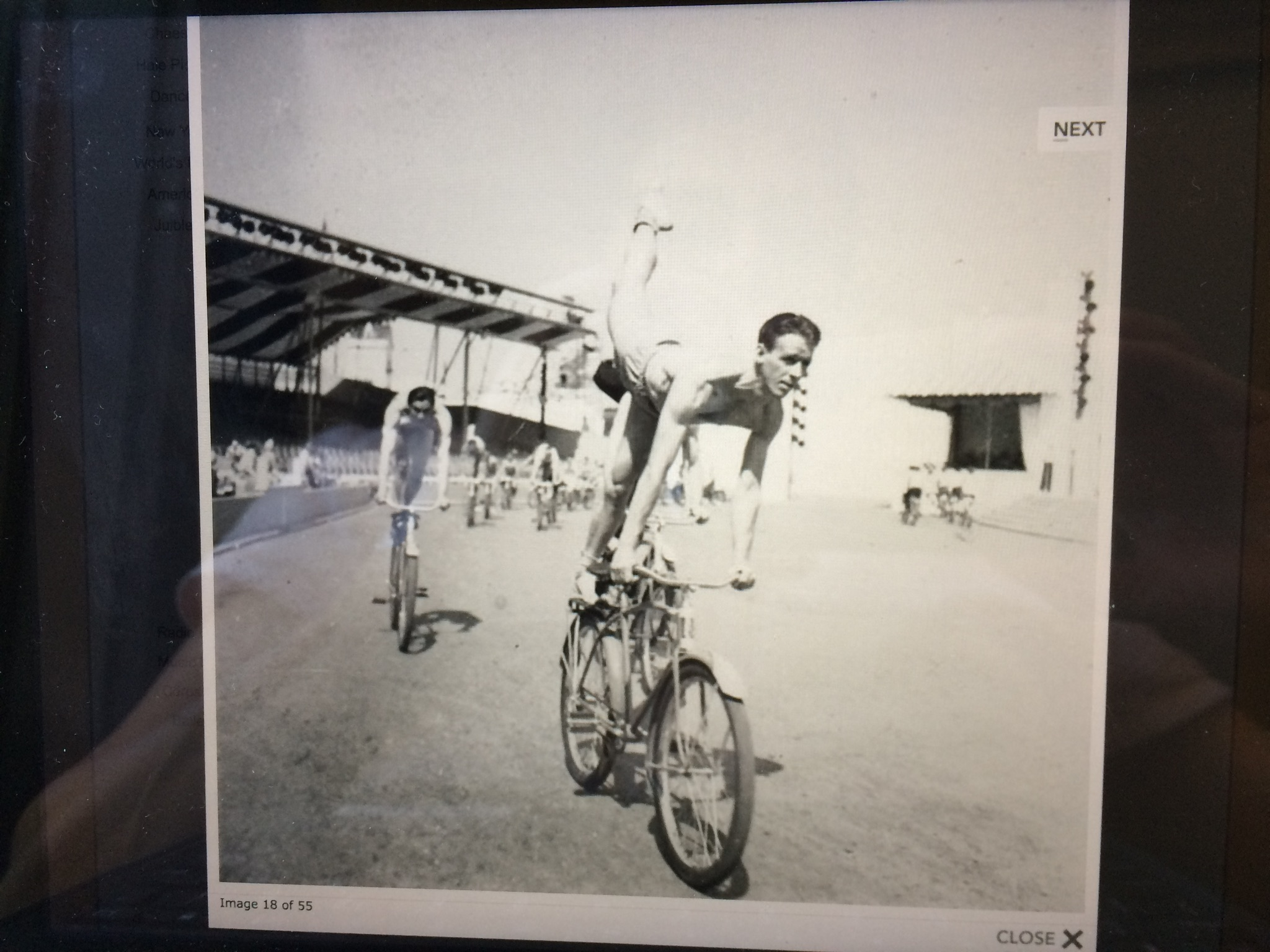

Even before Littlefield disbanded her company, she had been pursuing commercial work. Her most ambitious and widely seen undertaking was American Jubilee, an historical pageant at the 1940 New York World's Fair that featured a 350-member cast of singers, actors, and dancers. It was performed multiple times each day for 24 weeks in an outdoor arena. Its most innovative routine, "My Bicycle Girl," featured 75 men and women riding bicycles "with extended limbs and elevation assisted by the use of pedals and handlebars, and in elaborate ground maneuvers." Kirstein praised the routine as a "clear if complex blending of human anatomy, solid geometry, and acrobatics offered as a symbolic demonstration of manners."

Throughout the 1940s, Littlefield also choreographed Broadway musicals, including Hold onto Your Hats, Crazy with the Heat, Follow the Girls, The Firebrand of Florence, and Sweethearts. In addition, she choreographed ice-skating shows for Broadway's Center Theatre (which had converted its stage into a permanent ice rink) and for Sonja Henie's touring Hollywood Ice Revues. Although Littlefield never learned to skate, she understood how to apply a dancer's sensibility to skating. The hard-to-please Henie trusted her implicitly.

Toward the end of her life, Littlefield entered the field of television, staging skits for Jimmy Durante's Four-Star Revue, a variety show broadcast live by NBC. She saw a future for herself in the burgeoning television industry as well as in directing and producing on Broadway, but cancer took her life prematurely at age 46.

== Personal life ==
Among her family, friends, and close associates, Littlefield was warm, funny, and down to earth, while in professional situations she maintained her distance and radiated authority. With her blue eyes, platinum blonde hair, fine jewelry and well-tailored clothes (including an ever-present floor-length fur coat), she cut a glamorous figure. In 1940, she was named one of the country's "Ten Best-Dressed Women." Young dancers often claimed her as their role model.

Littlefield was musically adept, able to read scores and conduct orchestras during rehearsals when necessary. Although she never graduated from high school, she was well read and informed about current events. She was politically conservative, unlike many of her colleagues in the dance world. She was a Francophile and could speak French fluently.

The Littlefields remained unusually close into adulthood. Littlefield's brother Jimmie was the only sibling not to dance professionally. A musician like his mother, he formed and directed a nightclub orchestra and published his own songs, some of which were used in his older sister's ice shows at Centre Theatre. He later married a Philadelphia widow and moved with her to a farm on the Potomac River near Montross, Virginia. Littlefield bought a bungalow nearby and the extended family often retreated to the area to be together and relax. Jimmie died at the farm at age 37 after moving hay on an extremely hot day. As for the other family members: Dorothie married twice and had one daughter before succumbing to a heart attack at age 43. Carl became a highly decorated pilot in World War II. He later married Lois Girard, had three children, and moved to California to work in the airline industry. He died in 1966. Littlefield's father had died in 1934, while Mommie died in 1957 at age 75, having outlived three of her four children.

Littlefield and Philip Leidy separated around 1940 and divorced amicably in 1946. He had developed a progressive neurological disease that necessitated a wheelchair and didn't want his ambitious wife to feel obligated to nurse him. After their divorce, Leidy remained close to the Littlefields and continued to handle their legal affairs. In 1947, Littlefield married Sterling Noel, a newspaper editor and novelist, whose most successful book was entitled I Killed Stalin. The couple lived in a penthouse apartment overlooking the East River in New York and socialized frequently with theatrical and literary friends.

Besides her two husbands, Littlefield was romantically linked at different points in her life with singer/actor Nelson Eddy, ice skater Jimmy Caesar, and German emigre composer Kurt Weill.

Littlefield developed breast cancer and died in November 1951, having just completed work on the 1951-52 edition of the Hollywood Ice Revue. She is buried in Philadelphia's Chelten Hills Cemetery.

== Legacy ==
While Littlefield is best remembered for producing ballet Americana, she worked successfully in a wide variety of dance genres, including movie palace stage shows, Broadway musicals, stadium pageants, ice-skating routines, and television skits. Critic Walter Terry summarized her versatility: "Catherine Littlefield is becoming a theater figure of the first rank, a girl who is leaving her mark in the revue, in the ballet and on ice." Her legacy as a teacher is less well known but equally as important. The dancer/choreographers with whom she is most often compared—Ruth Page, for example—never ran a school on the scale that she did. (Nor did they dance as well.) Littlefield's protegees were foundational to the two most influential ballet companies that exist in America today: the New York City Ballet and American Ballet Theatre.

In May 2010, the Philadelphia Sinfonia youth orchestra gave a rousing, multi-media performance of Cafe Society at Philadelphia's Kimmel Center. The performance combined the Ferde Grofé ballet music Littlefield had commissioned with critic Ann Barzel's film footage and still photographs.

== Resources ==
- Aloff, Mindy. "In Philadelphia: The Littlefield Ballet Lives for an Afternoon- Ferde Grofé's Café Society." Explore Dance, Last modified May 2, 2010. ExploreDance
- "Catherine Littlefield (1905-1951)". National Museum of Dance. Accessed March 20, 2015. National Museum Of Dance: Hall Of Fame
- Friedler, Sharon E., and Glazer, Susan B.. Dancing Female: Lives and Issues of Women in Contemporary Dance. Hoboken: Taylor and Francis, 2014.
- Liebman, Elizabeth A. "Catherine Littlefield's Bicycle Ballet and the 1940 World's Fair." Dance Chronicle 36 no. 3 (2013): 326–351. Accessed March 26, 2015. Catherine Littlefield's Bicycle Ballet and the 1940 World's Fair
- Skeel, Sharon. Catherine Littlefield: A Life in Dance. New York: Oxford University Press, 2020; www.catherinelittlefield.com
