= Dorothie Littlefield =

American ballet dancer (1912-1953)

- Born: September 16, 1912; Philadelphia, Pennsylvania
- Died: August 24, 1953 (aged 40); Evanston
- Occupation: dancer

Dorothie Littlefield (1912–1953) was an American ballet dancer, She was the daughter of the dancer Caroline Littlefield (c. 1882–1957) and the sister of the dancer Catherine Littlefield (1904–1951).

Littlefield was born on September 16, 1912, in Philadelphia, Pennsylvania, She was taught to dance by her mother. In the 1930s she taught at the children's division of the newly established School of American Ballet. The following year she left to work with her mother and sister in the Littlefield Ballet in Philadelphia. In 1937 she danced the lead in Barn Dance.

Littlefield danced on Broadway and in ice shows.

Littlefield died on August 24, 1953, in Evanston, Illinois at the age of 40.

Dorothie and Catherine Littlefield were the subject of a chapter in the 1998 book "Dancing Female" edited by Sharon E. Friedler, Susan B. Glazer ISBN 9781315078779.
