= Laurence Shanet =

American film director

Laurence Paul Shanet (born New York City, October 1, 1976) is an American commercial director and film director, also known under his working moniker Kranky. He has also directed music videos, internet content and stage plays, and worked at various times as a writer and producer, in both the advertising and entertainment industries. His work has won the 2004 Young Director Award at the Cannes Lions International Festival (sponsored by Commercial Film Producers of Europe), and is part of the permanent collection of the Museum of Modern Art (via their joint award with the Association of Independent Commercial Producers).

== Overview ==
He attended the Bronx High School of Science and Johns Hopkins University, where he studied film, as well as writing and psychology.

Originally, the name "Kranky" represented Laurence Shanet and his directing partner David M. Rosenthal (director of the movie Janie Jones (2010)) up to their series of spots for Master Cabbie (2003); since their 2003 parting, "Kranky" has been kept as Laurence Shanet's working moniker and production company name. He is sometimes also credited as "Laurence Shanet" or "Larry Shanet".

Known best for his commercial work, he managed advertising accounts for clients Legg Mason and the National Aquarium in Baltimore. He has directed commercials for Pepsi, Volkswagen and Starburst, among others. His work has been seen in most of the industry's major awards shows, and is part of the permanent collection of the Museum of Modern Art, via their joint award with the Association of Independent Commercial Producers. Larry currently owns a production company with creative partner, Wayne Best, called Tent. [tentcontent.com]

He is also known for various projects in the entertainment world. He was the Head Writer and co-creator of the animated series "Badtime Stories" (a.k.a. "8:37"), and, in 2002, he directed the popular Off-Broadway play "Connections", a comedy about internet dating. In 2018, Shanet directed and co-produced the pilot of the television show "Cuff", which was an official selection in the drama competitions at the New York Television Festival and the Independent Television Festival. He was also announced as the director of the television movie "Chase the Ace", featuring Matthew Rauch and Zina Wilde.

== Personal life ==
On 5 February 2012, he married his longtime girlfriend, actress Alyssa Sutherland, at Natai Beach, in Thailand. They divorced shortly thereafter in November 2013.

== Honors ==
Awards

- 2004: AICP Show/Museum of Modern Art – Honoree ("Low Budget" category)
- 2004: CFP-E (Commercial Film Producers of Europe) Cannes Lions Festival Young Director Award ("Non European Broadcast" category) – 1st prize to directorial team Kranky (incl. L. Shanet) for Master Cabbie commercials
- 2004: One Show – Merit Award for Finger, Reflex, Baby
- 2006: Regional Addy Awards – Gold – Television Campaign
- 2006: Regional Addy Awards – Best of Show
- 2014: Hermes Awards – Platinum – Best Non Profit Video for American Museum of Natural History
- 2014: Telly Awards – Silver – Best Internet/Online Cultural Video for American Museum of Natural History
- 2014: Creativity International Awards – Gold – Best Television and Radio (Consumer TV category)
- 2014: Communicator Awards – Award of Excellence for American Museum of Natural History
- 2017: Regional Addy Awards – Silver (Public Service Online Film, Video & Sound) for EWG Verified
- 2017: DoGooder Awards – Funny for Good Award for EWG Verified
- 2017: Deauville Green Awards for EWG Verified
- 2020: Muse Creative Awards – Silver – (Video) for Cogency Global

Nominations, shortlists, finalists

- 2001: London International Awards – Television/Cinema finalists ("Low Budget Campaign" category) (incl. Larry Shanet as agency producer) for Zilo Networks commercials
- 2003: London International Awards – Television/Cinema finalists for Master Cabbie Commercials
- 2004: Clio Awards – Television/Cinema shortlist to Kranky production (incl. L. Shanet) for Master Cabbie commercials
- 2005: Clio Awards – Television/Cinema shortlist (incl. Kranky as producer) for Vancouver's Z95 Radio commercials
- 2006: Cannes Lions International Advertising Festival – Film Shortlist
- 2006: Clio Awards – Television/Cinema for Minnesota State Lottery campaign
- 2007 London International Awards – Television/Cinema finalists ("Entertainment" category) for Minnesota State Lottery\
- 2014 Luerzer's Archive – featured selection for American Museum of Natural History
- 2017 Luerzer's Archive – featured selection for EWG Verified
