= Super Comet: After the Impact =

Super Comet: After The Impact (Also known as Armageddon: Der Einschlag) is a 2007 German-American speculative documentary produced by ZDF and the Discovery Channel. It was directed by Stefan Schneider.

== Summary ==
The two-hour production hypothesizes the effects on modern-day earth of a large comet impacting in Mexico near the same location of the Cretaceous–Paleogene extinction event, the ancient impact of a comet or meteor that is believed to have triggered the mass extinction of the dinosaurs.

The film alternates between interviews with climatologists and researchers and dramatized scenes following several groups of people as they attempt to survive in the days and months after the disaster: a separated family in France, a pair of scientists in Hawaii, a man who manages to survive for a period of time near the ground zero impact in Mexico, and a tribe in Cameroon.

== DVD release ==
Discovery Channel released the film to DVD in North America on Dec.4, 2007.
