= Shedrack Anderson III =

American actor (born 1977)

- Born: February 4, 1977 (age 49); Los Angeles, California, U.S.
- Occupation: Actor
- Years active: 1992–present
- Spouse: Kathryn Hunt Anderson
- Children: 1

Shedrack Anderson III (born February 4, 1977) is an American actor, director, producer, writer, dancer, recording artist, martial artist and entrepreneur. He began his professional screen career as a Lost Boy in Steven Spielberg's Hook and later became known for portraying Jermaine Greene in the NBC television series Just Deal and Rudy in the 2004 feature film Fat Albert. His other acting credits include Warriors of Virtue: The Return to Tao, Gracie’s Choice, Boston Public, The Parkers, The Division, Phil of the Future, Drive-Thru, Stompin’, Grizzly Park, The Rookie, Fighter’s Chance, The Statue Man, Jacob, Broken by God, Melody Road, and Ripple. (IMDb)

Anderson has also worked as a director and producer, including on the feature film Blood River, which he wrote, directed and starred in alongside fellow Hook actor Dante Basco. His directing credits include Blood River, 3’s a Couple, I’m Coming Out, Sign Language, The Daily Chil with Shedrack, Next Top Model Kids, and Melody Road. (IMDb)

== Early life ==
Anderson was born in Los Angeles, California. Anderson attended the Los Angeles County High School for the Arts, where he won the Ahmanson Scholarship and Emerging Artist of the Year Award from PBS. After high school, he attended the Juilliard School in New York, where he became interested in dance. He was a principal dancer of Ballet Hispanico of New York and became an assistant choreographer for Alvin Ailey American Dance Theatre.

== Career ==
Anderson originally made his debut as a lost boy in the Steven Spielberg film Hook, before starring in the NBC teen series Just Deal as Jermaine Green. In 2004, he appeared in Fat Albert as Rudolph "Rudy" Davis.

Anderson then starred as Tommy in Lifetime's Gracie's Choice, Chucky in Warriors of Virtue 2, and has guest starred on several television series including: Boston Public, The Parkers, Hollywood Lives, Hip Hop Massive and The Division.

Anderson was a recurring star on Disney's Phil of the Future. Shedrack wrote, directed, and starred in the film Blood River with fellow lost boy co-star Dante Basco.

== Other ventures ==
In 1999, Anderson began his own production company to produce his own films.

== Personal life ==
Anderson married Pilates instructor Kathryn Hunt in 2010 and has one daughter.

== Filmography ==
Film

- Hook (1991) — Lost Boy
- Warriors of Virtue: The Return to Tao (2002) — Chucky
- Fat Albert (2004) — Rudy
- Drive-Thru (2007) — Chuck Taylor
- Stompin’ (2008) — Ryan
- Grizzly Park (2008) — Ty
- Blood River — Dion
- Fighter’s Chance (2012) — Sean Banes
- The Statue Man (2022) — Statue Man
- Table for Two (2023) — Sam
- Melody Road (2024) — Trombone Slim
- Ripple (2026) — Maurice (IMDb)

Television

- Boston Public — Bernie
- Just Deal — Jermaine Greene
- The Parkers — Guy / Partygoer
- The Division — Jerome Miller
- Phil of the Future — Chip
- Behind the Camera: The Unauthorized Story of ‘Diff’rent Strokes’ — Todd Bridges
- The Rookie: Day 3 Extraction — Brett Rogers (IMDb)

As director

- Blood River
- Moxie
- Sign Language
- I’m Coming Out
- 3’s a Couple
- The Daily Chil with Shedrack
- Next Top Model Kids
- Melody Road (IMDb)
