= Kay Starr discography =

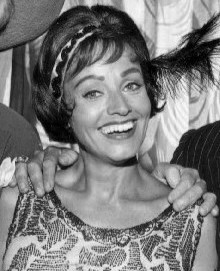
- Kay Starr, 1962.
- Studio albums: 18
- Live albums: 1
- Compilation albums: 18
- Singles: 87
- Other charted songs: 12
- Album appearances: 1

The discography of American singer Kay Starr contains 18 studio albums, 18 compilation albums, one live album, 87 singles, 12 other charting songs and one additional album appearance. Starr's first singles were released in collaboration with the Ben Pollack Orchestra. She signed to Capitol Records as a solo artist and had her first chart record in 1948 with "You Were Only Foolin' (While I Was Fallin' in Love)". It reached number 16 on the American Billboard pop music chart. It was followed the same year by her first top ten pop single "So Tired". In 1950, "Bonaparte's Retreat" reached the top five of the Billboard pop chart. Starr reached the top five again with "Hoop-Dee-Doo" and "I'll Never Be Free" (a collaboration with Tennessee Ernie Ford).

In 1952, the single "Wheel of Fortune" topped the American pop chart and climbed to number two on the Australian Kent Music Report pop survey. Between 1952 and 1953, Starr had top ten singles with "Comes A-Long A-Love", "Side by Side", "Half a Photograph", "Changing Partners" and "If You Love Me (Really Love Me)". These songs also reached top positions in Australia and the United Kingdom. Notably, "Comes A-Long A-Love" topped the UK Singles Chart in 1952. In 1955, Starr moved to RCA Victor and topped the American, Australian and British charts with the single "The Rock and Roll Waltz". The same year, Starr's debut studio album was released on Capitol titled The Kay Starr Style. Yet, RCA Victor issued four studio albums of her recordings including Blue Starr (1957) and Rockin' with Kay (1957). In 1957, the single "My Heart Reminds Me" reached the top ten of the Billboard pop chart.

Starr returned to Capitol Records in 1959 and the label soon released the studio album Movin'!, which reached number 16 on the UK Albums Chart. The following year, Capitol released three studio albums of her material: Losers, Weepers, Movin' on Broadway! and Kay Starr: Jazz Singer. The next year a country album was released titled Just Plain Country, which featured the charting single "Four Walls". Other charting singles of this period included "Foolin' Around" and a solo version of "I'll Never Be Free". In 1966, Starr made the Billboard adult contemporary chart for the first time "Tears and Heartaches". A corresponding album appeared on Capitol in 1966. Starr continued recording for various labels through the 1980s. This included a collaboration with Count Basie and a live album in the 1980s.

== Albums ==
=== Studio albums ===
List of studio albums, with selected chart positions, and other relevant details
Title	Album details	Peak chart positions
Title	Album details	UK
The Kay Starr Style	Released: 1955; Label: Capitol; Formats: LP	—
In a Blue Mood	Released: 1956; Label: Capitol; Formats: LP	—
The One, The Only Kay Starr	Released: 1956; Label: RCA Victor; Formats: LP	—
Blue Starr	Released: 1957; Label: RCA Victor; Formats: LP	—
Rockin' with Kay	Released: 1957; Label: RCA Victor; Formats: LP	—
I Hear the Word	Released: 1959; Label: RCA Victor; Formats: LP	—
Movin'!	Released: 1959; Label: Capitol; Formats: LP	16
Losers, Weepers	Released: 1960; Label: Capitol; Formats: LP	—
Movin' on Broadway!	Released: 1960; Label: Capitol; Formats: LP	—
Kay Starr: Jazz Singer	Released: 1960; Label: Capitol; Formats: LP	—
Just Plain Country	Released: 1962; Label: Capitol; Formats: LP	—
I Cry by Night	Released: 1962; Label: Capitol; Formats: LP	—
Tears and Heartaches/Old Records	Released: 1966; Label: Capitol; Formats: LP	—
When the Lights Go on Again	Released: January 1968; Label: ABC; Formats: LP	—
How About This (with Count Basie)	Released: 1969; Label: Paramount; Formats: LP	—
Kay Starr Country	Released: 1974; Label: GNP Crescendo; Formats: LP	—
Back to the Roots	Released: 1975; Label: GNP Crescendo; Formats: LP	—
Kay Starr	Released: 1981; Label: GNP Crescendo; Formats: LP	—
"—" denotes a recording that did not chart or was not released in that territory.

=== Compilation albums ===
List of compilation albums, showing all relevant details
Title	Album details
Songs by Kay Starr	Released: 1950; Label: Capitol; Formats: LP
The Hits of Kay Starr	Released: 1956; Label: Capitol; Formats: LP
Swingin' with the Starr	Released: 1956; Label: Liberty; Formats: LP
Kay Starr	Released: 1960; Label: RCA Camden; Formats: LP
All Starr Hits	Released: 1961; Label: Capitol; Formats: LP
One More Time	Released: 1960; Label: Capitol; Formats: LP
Kay Starr's Again	Released: 1974; Label: Capitol; Formats: LP
Kay Starr	Released: 1975; Label: Capitol; Formats: LP
Pure Gold	Released: 1976; Label: RCA Victor; Formats: LP
20 Golden Greats	Released: 1984; Label: Capitol; Formats: LP
Wheel of Fortune & Other Hits	Released: 1984; Label: CEMA Special Products; Formats: Cassette
Capitol Collectors Series	Released: March 18, 1991; Label: Capitol/EMI; Formats: CD
Greatest Hits	Released: 1991; Label: Curb; Formats: CD, cassette
Spotlight on Kay Starr (Great Ladies of Song)	Released: August 1, 1995; Label: Capitol/EMI; Formats: CD, cassette
Kay Starr Sings Standards	Released: 1997; Label: Hallmark; Formats: CD
The RCA Years	Released: 1998; Label: Collectors Choice; Formats: CD
Definitive Kay Starr on Capitol	Released: July 9, 2002; Label: Capitol/Collectors Choice/EMI; Formats: CD
The Ultimate Collection	Released: April 9, 2007; Label: Capitol/EMI; Formats: CD

=== Live albums ===
List of live albums, showing all relevant details
Title	Album details
Live at Freddy's	Released: 1986; Label: Baldwin Street; Formats: CD

== Singles ==
List of lead artist singles, with selected chart positions, showing other relevant details
Title	Year	Peak chart positions				Album
Title	Year	US	US AC	AUS	UK	Album
"Honey" (with Ben Pollack Orchestra)	1945	—	—	—	—	—N/a
"Should I" (with Ben Pollack Orchestra)	1945	—	—	—	—	—N/a
"After You're Gone" (with the Lantern Five)	1946	—	—	—	—	—N/a
"Love Me or Leave Me" (with the Lantern Five)	1946	—	—	—	—	—N/a
"Share Croppin' Blues"	1947	—	—	—	—	—N/a
"Then I'll Be Tired of You"	1948	—	—	—	—	—N/a
"You've Got to See Your Mama Every Night"	1948	—	—	—	—	Songs by Kay Starr
"Snuggled on Your Shoulder (Cuddled in Your Arms)"	1948	—	—	—	—	—N/a
"Many Happy Returns of the Day"	1948	—	—	—	—	—N/a
"You Were Only Fooling (While I Was Falling in Love)"	1948	16	—	—	—	—N/a
"Please Love Me"	1948	—	—	—	—	—N/a
"So Tired"	1948	7	—	—	—	—N/a
"You Broke Your Promise"	1949	—	—	—	—	—N/a
"How It Lies, How It Lies, How It Lies"	1949	28	—	—	—	—N/a
"I'm Oh So Lonesome Tonight"	1949	—	—	—	—	—N/a
"I Wish I Had a Wishbone"	1949	—	—	—	—	—N/a
"Ya Gotta Buy, Buy, Buy, For Baby"	1949	—	—	—	—	Songs by Kay Starr
"Tell Me How Long the Train's Been Gone"	1949	—	—	—	—	—N/a
"Stormy Weather"	1950	—	—	—	—	—N/a
"Flow Gently Sweet Afton"	1950	—	—	—	—	—N/a
"Bonaparte's Retreat"	1950	4	—	1	—	—N/a
"Hoop-Dee-Doo"	1950	2	—	5	—	—N/a
"Mississippi"	1950	18	—	7	—	—N/a
"I'll Never Be Free" (with Tennessee Ernie Ford)	1950	3	—	—	—	—N/a
"The Texas Song"	1950	—	—	—	—	—N/a
"Honeymoon"	1950	—	—	—	—	—N/a
"Mama Goes Where Papa Goes"	1950	—	—	—	—	Songs by Kay Starr
"(Everybody's Waitin' For) the Man with the Bag"	1950	—	—	—	—	—N/a
"Oh Babe"	1950	7	—	—	—	—N/a
"Lovesick Blues"	1951	—	—	—	—	—N/a
"Come Back My Darling"	1951	—	—	—	—	—N/a
"Ocean of Tears" (with Tennessee Ernie Ford)	1951	15	—	19	—	—N/a
"Come On-a My House"	1951	8	—	8	—	—N/a
"Angry"	1951	26	—	—	—	—N/a
"On a Honky Tonk Hardwood Floor"	1951	—	—	—	—	—N/a
"So Help Me"	1951	—	—	—	—	—N/a
"Wheel of Fortune"	1952	1	—	2	—	The Hits of Kay Starr
"I Waited a Little Too Long"	1952	20	—	13	—	The Hits of Kay Starr
"Fool, Fool, Fool"	1952	13	—	—	—	The Hits of Kay Starr
"Comes A-Long A-Love"	1952	9	—	20	1	The Hits of Kay Starr
"Side by Side"	1953	3	—	6	7	The Kay Starr Style
"Half a Photograph"	1953	7	—	12	—	The Hits of Kay Starr
"When My Dreamboat Comes Home"	1953	18	—	—	—	The Kay Starr Style
"Changing Partners"	1953	7	—	4	4	—N/a
"If You Love Me (Really Love Me)"	1954	4	—	13	—	The Hits of Kay Starr
"Fortune in Dreams"	1954	17	—	—	—	The Hits of Kay Starr
"If Anyone Finds This, I Love You"	1955	—	—	—	—	—N/a
"Foolishly Yours"	1955	—	—	—	—	—N/a
"Good and Lonesome"	1955	17	—	—	—	—N/a
"Without a Song"	1955	—	—	—	—	—N/a
"The Rock and Roll Waltz"	1955	1	—	1	1	—N/a
"Second Fiddle"	1956	40	—	—	—	—N/a
"The Good Book"	1956	89	—	—	—	—N/a
"Touch and Go"	1956	—	—	—	—	—N/a
"Jamie Boy"	1957	54	—	—	—	—N/a
"My Heart Reminds Me"	1957	9	—	15	—	—N/a
"Help Me"	1957	—	—	—	—	—N/a
"Rockin' Chair"	1958	—	—	—	—	Rockin' with Kay
"Voodoo Man"	1958	—	—	—	—	—N/a
"He Cha Cha'd In"	1958	—	—	—	—	—N/a
"I Couldn't Care Less"	1959	—	—	—	—	—N/a
"Riders in the Sky"	1959	—	—	—	—	Movin'!
"You Always Hurt the One You Love"	1960	—	—	—	—	Losers Weepers
"Just for a Thrill"	1960	—	—	—	—	All Starr Hits!
"Foolin' Around"	1961	49	—	84	—	—N/a
"I'll Never Be Free"	1961	94	—	—	—	—N/a
"Well I Ask Ya"	1961	—	—	—	—	—N/a
"Four Walls"	1962	92	—	—	—	Just Plain Country
"Bossa Nova Casanova"	1962	—	—	—	—	—N/a
"No Regrets"	1963	—	—	—	—	—N/a
"To Each His Own"	1963	—	—	—	—	—N/a
"Dancing on My Tears"	1964	—	—	—	—	—N/a
"Friends"	1964	—	—	—	—	—N/a
"Look on the Brighter Side"	1965	—	—	—	—	—N/a
"I Forgot to Forget"	1965	—	—	—	—	—N/a
"Never Dreamed I Could Love Someone New"	1965	—	23	—	—	Tears and Heartaches/Old Records
"Tears and Heartaches"	1966	—	19	—	—	Tears and Heartaches/Old Records
"When the Lights Go On Again (All Over the World)"	1967	—	24	—	—	When the Lights Go on Again
"Some Sweet Tomorrow"	1968	—	—	—	—	When the Lights Go on Again
"12th Street Marching Band"	1968	—	—	—	—	—N/a
"Knock, Knock Who's There?"	1970	—	—	—	—	—N/a
"Rangers Waltz"	1973	—	—	—	—	Kay Starr Country
"New Frankie and Johnny"	1974	—	—	—	—	Kay Starr Country
"Something's Missing"	1974	—	—	—	—	Kay Starr Country
"What Can I Say After I Say I'm Sorry"	1975	—	—	—	—	Back to the Roots
"Nickelodeon Rag"	1981	—	—	—	—	Kay Starr
"The Feeling Doesn't Go Away"	1981	—	—	—	—	Kay Starr
"—" denotes a recording that did not chart or was not released in that territory.

== Other charted songs ==
List of songs, with selected chart positions, showing other relevant details
Title	Year	Peak chart positions					Album	Notes
Title	Year	US	US AC	US Cou.	AUS	UK	Album	Notes
"Ain't Nobody's Business But My Own" (with Tennessee Ernie Ford)	1950	22	—	5	—	—	—N/a	(Note: B-side to the single "I'll Never Be Free".)
"You're My Sugar" (with Tennessee Ernie Ford)	1952	22	—	—	—	—	—N/a	(Note: B-side to the single "Ocean of Tears".)
"Three Letters"	1952	22	—	—	—	—	—N/a	(Note: B-side to the single "Comes A-Long A-Love".)
"Allez-Vous-En"	1953	11	—	—	—	—	The Hits of Kay Starr	(Note: B-side to the single "Half a Photograph".)
"Swamp Fire"	1953	30	—	—	—	—	One More Time	(Note: B-side to the single "When My Dreamboat Comes Home".)
"The Man Upstairs"	1954	7	—	—	—	—	The Hits of Kay Starr	(Note: B-side to the single "If You Love Me (Really Love Me)".)
"Am I a Toy or a Treasure"	1954	22	—	—	—	17	—N/a	(Note: B-side to the single "Fortune in Dreams".)
"I've Changed My Mind a Thousand Times"	1956	73	—	—	—	—	—N/a	(Note: B-side to the single "The Rock and Roll Waltz".)
"Love Ain't Right"	1956	89	—	—	—	—	—N/a	(Note: B-side to the single "Second Fiddle".)
"Things I Never Had"	1956	89	—	—	—	—	—N/a	(Note: B-side to the single "The Good Book".)
"(I Don't Care) Only Love Me"	1959	—	—	—	7	—	—N/a	(Note: B-side to the single "I Couldn't Care Less".)
"Old Records"	1966	—	26	—	—	—	Tears and Heartaches/Old Records	(Note: B-side to the single "Tears and Heartaches".)
"—" denotes a recording that did not chart or was not released in that territory.

== Other album appearances ==
List of non-single guest appearances, with other performing artists, showing year released and album name
Title	Year	Other artist(s)	Album	Ref.
"Blue and Sentimental"	2001	Tony Bennett	Playin' with My Friends: Bennett Sings the Blues	
