= Second Fiddle =

A second fiddle is a fiddle that supplements the first fiddle in the string section of an orchestra. It may also refer to a subordinate or assistant role (for example that of a sidekick).

Second Fiddle may refer to:

- Second Fiddle (1923 film), an American silent comedy-drama
- Second Fiddle (1939 film), an American musical romance
- Second Fiddle (1957 film), a British comedy
- "Second Fiddle" (Doctors), a 2000 TV episode
- "Second Fiddle" (Lovejoy), a 1993 TV episode
- Second Fiddle (novel), a 1988 novel by Mary Wesley
- "Second Fiddle (To an Old Guitar)", a 1964 song by Jean Shepard
- "Second Fiddle", a 1956 song by Kay Starr
