= The Judas Pair =

1977 novel by Jonathan Gash

- First edition cover
- Author: Jonathan Gash
- Language: English
- Genre: Crime novel
- Publisher: Collins Crime Club
- Publication date: 1977
- Publication place: United Kingdom
- Media type: Print (Hardback)
- Pages: 210 pp.
- ISBN: 0-00-231383-9
- OCLC: 4466340
- Dewey Decimal: 823/.9/14
- LC Class: PZ4.G2468 Ju 1977 PR6057.A728

The Judas Pair is a crime novel by Jonathan Gash. It is the first book in the Lovejoy series. The story was first published in 1977 and won a John Creasey Award.

The story was adapted by Ian La Frenais for the BBC television series Lovejoy starring Ian McShane. The episode "The Judas Pair" first aired on 7 February 1986 as episode 5 of season 1.

== Plot summary ==
Antiques dealer Lovejoy is commissioned to hunt down what he considers to be a mythical object, the Judas pair, the supposed thirteenth pair of duelling pistols, an 18th-century flintlock made by the famous London gunmaker Durs Egg. After two murders Lovejoy is certain that the pistols do exist, and are now in the hands of the murderer.

Lovejoy solves the mystery by drawing from his comprehensive knowledge of the antique world, poring on the backgrounds of materials so that past and present deceit and criminality are revealed.

== Publication history ==
- The Judas Pair, Jonathan Gash, Collins Crime Club, 1977, ISBN 0-00-231383-9, hardcover
- The Judas Pair, Jonathan Gash, Harper & Row, 1977, ISBN 0-06-011464-9, hardcover
- The Judas Pair, Jonathan Gash, Dell Publishing, 1981, ISBN 0-440-14354-3, paperback
- The Judas Pair, Jonathan Gash, W. F. Howes, 1999, ISBN 1-84197-004-2, audiobook cassette
- The Judas Pair, Jonathan Gash, W. F. Howes, 2000, ISBN 1-84197-091-3, audiobook CD
