= When I Lost You =

1912 song by Irving Berlin

- Ballad by Irving Berlin
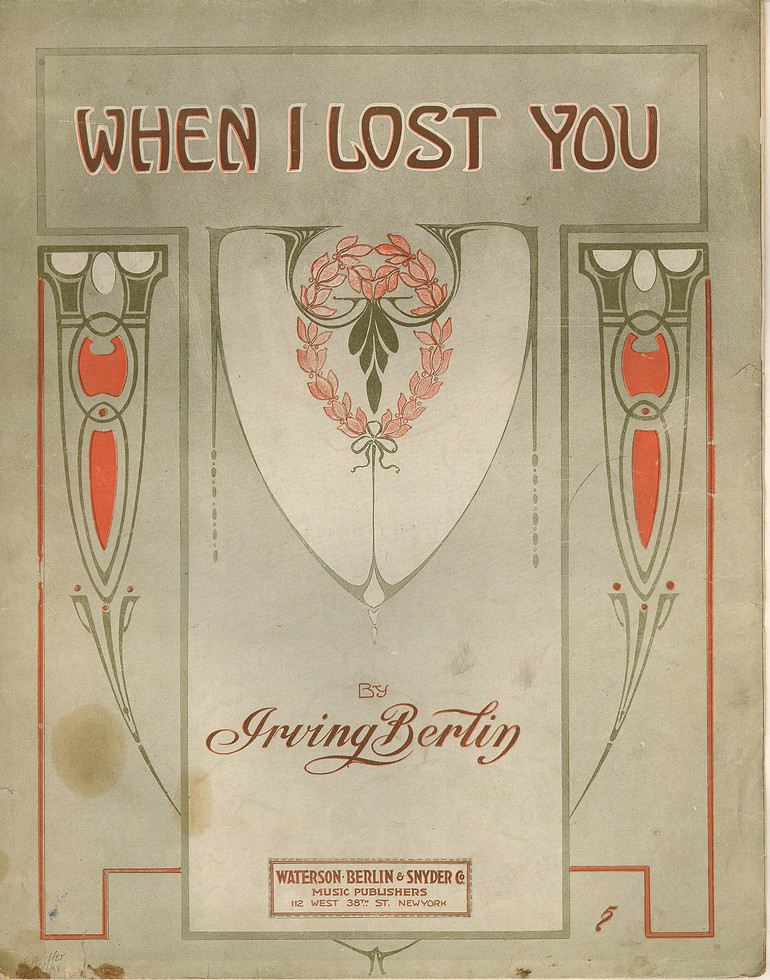
- Cover page to the sheet music.
- Written: 1912
- Publisher: Waterson, Berlin & Snyder, Inc.

"When I Lost You" is a song with music and lyrics by Irving Berlin. It was written in 1912 after his wife of five months, the former Dorothy Goetz, died of typhoid fever. In it he poured out the grief of his loss; it was the only song that he ever admitted had such a connection to his own life. The song, a ballad, was unlike any of Berlin's previous songs, which were upbeat tunes written to take advantage of the dance craze. The song is in a slow waltz tempo. It became Berlin's first hit ballad.

Berlin had published 130 songs by this point, none of which previously had revealed his ability to write with moving sentiment about his own personal pain.

== Composition ==
Berlin's initial attempts to resume songwriting after his wife's death were unsuccessful. After accepting an invitation to visit Europe with Dorothy's brother Ray Goetz, Berlin composed "When I Lost You". Following the trip, Berlin successfully returned to songwriting by writing about his wife's death, rather than attempting to avoid it.

The birds ceased their song
Right turned to wrong
Sweetheart when I lost you
A day turned to years
The world seemed in tears
Sweetheart when I lost you.

== Reception ==
Berlin did not make promotional appearances for the song during its first year of release, but the circumstances of his brief and tragic marriage were already common knowledge. The following year he performed the song in London.

== Notable recordings ==
"When I Lost You"
Sung by Henry Burr in 1913 for Edison Records

Early popular recordings of the song in 1913 were by Henry Burr and by Manuel Romain.

Others to record the song include:

- Lee Morse - Recorded June 6, 1928.
- Bing Crosby with The Paradise Island Trio - recorded July 20, 1940.
- The Mills Brothers - included in the album The Mills Brothers In Hi-Fi: Barbershop Ballads (1958).
- Kay Starr - for her album Losers, Weepers (1960).
- Frank Sinatra - included in his album All Alone (1962).
- Jim Reeves included in the album Moonlight and Roses (1964).
- Jimmy Durante - included in his album Jimmy Durante's Way of Life... (1964).
- Perry Como - for his album The Songs I Love (1963).
- Tony Bennett - included in the album Bennett/Berlin (1987).
