= List of Lovejoy episodes =

This is a list of episodes of the British television show Lovejoy which first aired between 1986 and 1994. The first series was broadcast in 1986, followed by a five-year hiatus before the second series in 1991.

Though there was a recurring supporting cast, the only actor to appear in all 71 episodes was Ian McShane, who played the eponymous role of Lovejoy, a likeable but roguish antiques dealer.

== Series overview ==
Series	Episodes	Originally released	
Series	Episodes	First released	Last released
1	10	10 January 1986	14 March 1986
2	11	6 January 1991	24 March 1991
3	13	12 January 1992	26 December 1992
4	13	10 January 1993	11 April 1993
5	14	5 September 1993	27 December 1993
6	10	2 October 1994	4 December 1994

== Episodes ==
=== Series 1 (1986) ===
No. overall	No. in series	Title	Directed by	Original release date
1	1	"The Firefly Cage"	David Reynolds	10 January 1986
Lovejoy, an East Anglian antiques dealer, acquires a new assistant, Eric. He also runs into Lady Jane Felsham and the two quickly form a bond, which displeases her husband, Lord Alexander. Meanwhile, Lovejoy is intrigued by an elaborate copy of a Japanese firefly cage carved out of coal and why it is so important to a gang of thieves. He is beaten in an auction for a Japanese firefly cage and tries to find the winning bidder. She ends up finding him, hoping he can help her discover the secrets held by a similar cage. Lovejoy finds himself on the wrong side of a gang of antique burglars and needs to set out into the North Sea to solve the mystery. All together an interesting introduction to antique dealing for his new apprentice Eric.
2	2	"The Axeman Cometh"	Roger Tucker	17 January 1986
When Lovejoy acquires a valuable Welsh dresser from under the nose of Charlie Gimbert, he is pursued to London by the axe-wielding maniac who hid loot in the dresser, and the Inland Revenue.
3	3	"The Sting"	Baz Taylor	24 January 1986
Lovejoy is hired to recover some valuable Meissen porcelain figures. It requires all his wiles and help from the gang to trick Gimbert into handing them over.
4	4	"Friends, Romans and Enemies"	Ken Hannam	31 January 1986
Lovejoy is behind on his rent again so Gimbert has him go through Bexon's estate. Lovejoy finds clues Bexon left to a Roman Hoard hidden on the Isle of Man. When an American couple turn up and start stealing Bexon's things, Lovejoy sets off on a treasure hunt to find the hoard before they do. The episode was based on the Lovejoy novel Gold by Gemini.
5	5	"The Judas Pair"	Baz Taylor	7 February 1986
A collector is murdered and robbed of a set of Durs Egg flintlock duelling pistols. The victim's brother claims they were the legendary Judas Pair and hires Lovejoy to recover them. When Lovejoy finds the pistols' turnscrew, he and Jane are stalked by the killer who is desperate to get it back and complete the set. The episode was based on Gash's first Lovejoy novel of the same name.
6	6	"To Sleep No More"	Ken Hannam	14 February 1986
Sam, an expert copyist, dies of a heart attack on his way to meet Lovejoy. Sam's widow is robbed of a snuff box Sam left her, so Lovejoy steals it back for her and realises that Sam made it as a clue pointing to a stash of stolen antiques. Lovejoy sets out to find them before Sam's accomplices do.
7	7	"The Real Thing"	Roger Tucker	21 February 1986
Lovejoy cons some demolishers out of a Victorian spiral staircase for a cottage Jane is renovating. To avoid them, Lovejoy heads to Norwich with Jane to help Tony Palmer set up a new antiques market. Lovejoy soon suspects the market is not what it appears to be. Meanwhile, Lovejoy borrows a painting from Jane to settle the score with some con artists who scammed his local shopkeeper.
8	8	"The March of Time"	Ken Hannam	28 February 1986
Lovejoy thinks he has struck it rich when he finds some love letters from a soldier who was at the Battle of Waterloo hidden in an old clock. When the clock case is stolen, and Gimbert informs him that the originals are on display in the regiment's museum, Lovejoy investigates to find out what is going on.
9	9	"Death and Venice (Part 1)"	Baz Taylor	7 March 1986
When a dealer is murdered for a Venetian painting that Lovejoy identified as a fake, the evidence leads to a wealthy American named Pinder and his beautiful daughter Caterina. They claim to belong to a syndicate that is preserving Venice's greatest treasures and want Lovejoy's assistance. Suspicious, Lovejoy travels to Venice to find out what is really going on.
10	10	"Death and Venice (Part 2)"	Baz Taylor	14 March 1986
Lovejoy establishes his bona fides to Pinder's other daughter Lavina by passing a drawing annotated by The Reliable Venetian Hand off as a forgery. He is put to work in the syndicate's secret workshop where he forms an alliance with a Scottish forger nicknamed Luciano. They try to figure out who is behind the disappearance of artworks and put a stop to it.

=== Series 2 (1991) ===
No. overall	No. in series	Title	Directed by	Original release date
11	1	"Just Desserts"	Don Leaver	6 January 1991
Lovejoy is released from prison after an eight-month sentence for dealing in stolen goods. Jane, who has kept in touch, picks him up and takes him out for lunch. She rents him a cottage on the estate and gives him her old Morris Minor named Miriam to help him get back on his feet. Lovejoy wants to find out who set him up with a stolen dresser and exact compensation for his time inside.
12	2	"The Italian Venus"	John Woods	13 January 1991
Jane asks Lovejoy to help a friend, Emma, who suspects that her artist husband Doug is doing something illegal. Doug comes from a wealthy aristocratic family, but his elder brother Hugo inherited everything under primogeniture. Lovejoy discovers that Doug is casting the fake bronzes that he has seen around. He hatches a scheme that exploits Hugo's greed for a missing 16th-century bronze Italian Venus to get Doug a share of his family's wealth and helps to set Doug up in business.
13	3	"Bin Diving"	Baz Taylor	20 January 1991
Eric falls foul of the local binmen when they catch him combing through rubbish on their patch. Jane asks Lovejoy to value a struggling widow's belongings. When she is burgled and a pair of antique shotguns are taken the police arrest Loveyjoy. He cannot supply an alibi because he spent the night on Lady Jane's couch after his car broke down while Alexander was away. A bin man who found the shotguns' case at the tip is also arrested. The burglars offer to sell Eric the shotguns and they set a trap with the binmen. The shotguns fetch a good price at auction.
14	4	"Montezuma's Revenge"	William Brayne	27 January 1991
The manager of a heavy metal band asks Lovejoy to sell a gold statue because he believes it is cursed after a run of bad luck, including the band's drummer dying in a car crash. Lovejoy discovers the statue is from a Colombian gold raft made as a sacrificial offering and many buyers are interested in it. Lovejoy puts it up for auction and tries to woo a beautiful dealer who wants to repatriate it to South America. People with connections to the statue and the raft start turning up dead and Lovejoy is framed for the murders. Lovejoy goes on the run and steals the statue to flush out the real killer.
15	5	"Who Dares Sings"	John Woods	3 February 1991
Lovejoy and Jane are outfitting a pub for Tinker's old army major. Miriam is stolen, Lovejoy is tricked into buying stolen furniture and the silver bowls that were supposed to be funding the operation have had their hallmarks removed to avoid tax and are only worth scrap value. Tinker bought a run-down piano which was being propped up by a second edition of Chaucer's Collected Works, which ensures everybody comes out ahead. Lovejoy tips the thieves off when he is taking Jane out for lunch, and they are arrested trying to burgle Felsham Hall. Lovejoy learns that Tinker was only a corporal and not an officer.
16	6	"One Born Every Minute"	Don Leaver	10 February 1991
Lovejoy is hired by a major to track down a travelling artist named Ashley Wilkes. Although highly talented, Wilkes spends his days doing paintings of local cottages and then seducing the bored housewives he sells them to. After Lovejoy finds Wilkes he is leant on by intelligence types. They are not really interested in Wilkes but the major's wife who ran away with him to learn how to paint. They want to ensure that information her father had about the Malaysian Emergency does not come to light and embarrass powerful people.
17	7	"National Wealth"	William Brayne	17 February 1991
Lovejoy and Tinker are hired by Madeleine Gilbert, an old movie star whom Tinker admires. She needs to quietly auction off some antiques to cover unpaid death duties. When her house is robbed of all its furniture and fixtures, Lovejoy suspects an inside job. The auctioneer confesses that her father has passed on information about her clients to a criminal gang he owes money to. She helps Lovejoy figure out where the next job will be and they tip off the police.
18	8	"Sugar and Spice"	Baz Taylor	24 February 1991
Khadija, a girl who goes to Lovejoy's daughter's public school, tries to sell Lovejoy some valuable antique pornography. At Parents' Day he talks to the Headmistress who denies all knowledge of the pornography and demands that Lovejoy pay fees owing. When Khadija returns with a man Lovejoy tries to warn him off and take the prints but they get away. The Headmistress expels Lovejoy's daughter and demands the pornography back. Lovejoy tracks down the man and steals the evidence he was using to blackmail Khadija's older sister. And has Jane pose as a buyer to flush out the collection and steals it back for the school.
19	9	"Raise the Hispanic"	Bill Hays	3 March 1991
Lovejoy is fitting out a house for the daughter of a wealthy industrialist who is getting married. The groom goes missing and Lovejoy stumbles across his corpse, which is hidden by the killer. Lovejoy must track down the corpse and extract a confession from the killer in order to unravel a case of fraud connected to events in South America twenty years ago.
20	10	"Lily's Pearls"	Bill Hays	10 March 1991
Lord Felsham has gone into business with a crass land developer. Lovejoy must get to the bottom of the scheme to protect his friends, even though Alexander refuses to listen to him. Meanwhile, a set of pearls belonging to the developer's wife that have been replaced with fakes multiple times cause confusion when false valuations are organised to cover it up.
21	11	"The Black Virgin of Vladimir"	Francis Megahy	24 March 1991
Lovejoy meets Harry Catapodis (Brian Blessed), a New York antiques dealer, at a charity auction. After Catapodis involves Lovejoy in a fraud on a Japanese Bank, Lovejoy checks out his friend Cassandra's collection and discovers that Catapodis has sold her several expensive fakes too. Lovejoy, Cassandra and the Banker get even by selling Catapodis a fake of a Russian icon by Andrei Rublev for £3 million (plus 10% commission for Lovejoy).

Notes: The final episode of Series 2, "The Black Virgin of Vladimir", was moved back a week because no episode was aired on Sunday 17 March 1991, because of the British Academy Awards.

In repeats, "The Black Virgin of Vladimir" is sometimes cut into two parts, with the first part entitled "Riding in Rollers".

=== Series 3 (1992) ===
No. overall	No. in series	Title	Directed by	Original release date
22	1	"Friends in High Places"	Sarah Hellings	12 January 1992
Lovejoy is asked to sell an antique ring on behalf of Victoria, a friend of Lady Jane. He lines up a South American banker as buyer, but then Jane is kidnapped and the ring is demanded as ransom. Lovejoy secures her freedom and discovers the banker is behind it all.
23	2	"Out to Lunch"	Sarah Hellings	19 January 1992
Lovejoy is more interested in spending time with Victoria than in helping Jane furnish a friend's house. He acquires a set of paintings cheaply and sells them on to a gallery when the artist himself appears and claims they are forgeries. Lovejoy tries to discover why.
24	3	"No Strings"	Peter Barber-Fleming	26 January 1992
After a charity concert hosted by Lady Felsham, the organiser makes off with the cash. The band ask Lovejoy to sell a valuable Celtic harp to make amends, but this is stolen too. Lovejoy sets out to recover both the money and the harp. Victoria returns to South America. Irish rock band Hothouse Flowers starred as themselves in this episode.
25	4	"Angel Trousers"	Baz Taylor	2 February 1992
Lovejoy is asked to sell a late Navy officer's personal effects, consisting of medals and wartime souvenirs. He arranges to sell to a collector, only for the medals to be stolen. Lovejoy suspects the late man's jailbird friend, but an odd Italian man holds the answer.
26	5	"Benin Bronze"	John Crome	9 February 1992
Lovejoy is advising an Australian collector who buys a valuable African statue, then enters into a dubious scheme to smuggle it back to Australia. When the man discovers he has been conned by the seller, he swears revenge on all those involved, including Lovejoy.
27	6	"Eric of Arabia"	Ian McShame	16 February 1992
Lovejoy discovers that a Chinese sculpture he has been asked to value is a fake. When it is smashed, a valuable banknote is found inside and Lovejoy sees an opportunity. Eric tries to sell a Brough motorcycle by convincing a buyer it was owned by T. E. Lawrence.
28	7	"Scotch on the Rocks"	Baz Taylor	23 February 1992
When his daughter finds an old sword in her attic, Lovejoy is approached by a Scottish property developer offering a large sum for it. He declines, but is then burgled. Lovejoy discovers that the sword is a clue that leads to buried gold that the man is trying to find.
29	8	"Loveknots"	Baz Taylor	1 March 1992
A Moroccan rug sells for much more than its value and Lovejoy tries to find out why. It is stolen from the new owner's home and Lovejoy draws out the thief with another rug. He discovers that the rug contains a hidden message for a young man from his sweetheart.
30	9	"Smoke Your Nose"	Baz Taylor	8 March 1992
Lovejoy meets a local vicar who tells him about a supposed Roman villa on nearby land. Lovejoy agrees to sell an antique dish in exchange for helping prove the existence of the villa. His investigations uncover a deal between a developer and an archaeologist.
31	10	"Kids"	Peter Barber-Fleming	15 March 1992
A female friend of Lovejoy's buys a forged painting. Lovejoy discovers that the original is owned by an MP whose son was involved in selling the forgery. He hatches a plan to expose the forgers. He also has to deal with his daughter, who has moved in with an older man.
32	11	"Members Only"	John Crome	22 March 1992
Lovejoy becomes involved in the affairs of a snobbish golf club. He helps a Japanese businessman find an antique to present as a gift. Lovejoy also discovers that a valuable silver cup owned by the club is a copy. He tries to find out what happened to the real trophy.
33	12	"Highland Fling"	Francis Megahy	29 March 1992
Part 1: Lovejoy accompanies Lady Jane on a trip to Scotland to visit a friend who runs a large estate. Needing to raise money, Jane's friend asks Lovejoy to organise the sale of an antique bureau, but he discovers that it has been replaced with a copy and decides to investigate. Part 2: Lovejoy finds some Italian drawings which may be valuable and connects them to the missing bureau and a businessman who knows Jane's friend. His investigations lead him to uncover family secrets, and he has to foil a scheme to acquire a painted pigsty.
34	13	"The Prague Sun"	Geoffrey Sax	26 December 1992
A female friend of Lovejoy's asks for help when her wartime sweetheart, a Czech RAF pilot, reappears after fifty years. The man has returned to England to collect a cache of diamonds that he concealed in a local church, but he is attacked when he tries to retrieve them. Discovering that the diamonds were originally part of a famous religious artefact, Lovejoy and Eric travel to Prague on the trail of the remaining jewels and encounter a mysterious figure who also wants them for himself and is prepared to kill to get them.

=== Series 4 (1993) ===
No. overall	No. in series	Title	Directed by	Original release date
35	1	"The Napoleonic Commode"	Baz Taylor	10 January 1993
Lovejoy has his possessions taken by bailiffs while house sitting for a friend. When he finds a commode that supposedly belonged to Napoleon, he uses it to try and recoup his losses. But in order to sell it for a profit, he must first dupe a French expert into authenticating it.
36	2	"The Ring"	John Crome	17 January 1993
Looking to make some cash on a set of paintings he has acquired, Lovejoy recruits a trio of old associates to take part in a scheme to bump up the price when one of the paintings is sold at auction. Lady Jane finds she was unwittingly caught up in the scheme.
37	3	"Second Fiddle"	John Crome	24 January 1993
Lovejoy is approached by a famous violinist who asks him to make a genuine Stradivarius violin look like a fake. He enlists the help of a forger who proves reluctant to do the job. Lovejoy discovers it is all part of a dispute between the violinist and his stepfather.
38	4	"The Colour of Mary"	Ian McShane	31 January 1993
Charlie Gimbert is back in town and managing a top snooker player. He hires Lovejoy to acquire an antique billiards table which allegedly had belonged to Mary, Queen of Scots, an avid fan of billiards, who had brought the table from France in 1561.
39	5	"Fly the Flag"	Rob Walker	7 February 1993
Needing to pay death duties, a family asks Lovejoy to value some antique furniture, but he discovers the pieces are fake. When an antique military flag is found, it could be the answer to their problems, but Lovejoy must first find out who actually owns it.
40	6	"The Judgement of Solomon"	Rob Walker	14 February 1993
An ex-RAF officer asks Lovejoy to sell some Jewish antiques but when he lines up a buyer, the man quickly sells them to Charlie Gimbert instead. Robbers then steal them from Gimbert's house. A Jewish collector exposes the man's identity as a wartime black marketeer.
41	7	"The Galloping Major"	Baz Taylor	21 February 1993
Lovejoy buys an antique cannon from a scrapyard owner. To find out more about it, he consults military expert Major Turpin. Lovejoy discovers that Turpin has tried to con him, and the cannon then mysteriously disappears. Lovejoy sets a trap to try and catch him.
42	8	"God Helps Those"	John Woods	28 February 1993
A gang is committing antiques robberies, including one in which a table Lovejoy is trying to sell is destroyed. Lady Jane disturbs the gang in the act of casing Felsham Hall and Lovejoy suspects Charlie Gimbert of being involved with them. He then unmasks the real culprits.
43	9	"They Call Me Midas"	John Crome	7 March 1993
Lovejoy's old mentor asks him to help get revenge on a Dutch art dealer who duped the man's father-in-law. Lovejoy ropes in Eric and Tinker to participate in a scheme to get the dealer to buy a painting and pay with diamonds, but he finds there is another con going on.
44	10	"Irish Stew"	John Crome	14 March 1993
While helping Jane buy antiques in Ireland, Lovejoy gets caught up in a burglary at the home of an old adversary. When the man denies he was burgled, Lovejoy is suspicious. He goes on the trail of an ancient book and he needs the help of an eccentric expert to find it.
45	11	"Dainty Dish"	John Woods	28 March 1993
After finding a valuable Wedgwood plate in the home of a Baroness, Lovejoy sets out to find the rest of the dinner service. He uses the help of a supposed psychic, whose predictions prove to be somewhat unreliable. Charlie Gimbert appears and tries to stop Lovejoy.
46	12	"Taking the Pledge"	Baz Taylor	4 April 1993
Lovejoy tries to help out an old friend who has become homeless thanks to a divorce settlement that left him with nothing but a painting, which he has been forced to pawn. Lovejoy tries to raise the money to buy the painting back before time runs out.
47	13	"Lovejoy Loses it"	Baz Taylor	11 April 1993
After demonstrating his prowess as a divvie on a TV show, Lovejoy gets into trouble when he fails to spot an antique wine cooler while helping a woman clear an old house. Accused of deliberately doing it for his own gain, Lovejoy consults an old colleague for advice.

=== Series 5 (1993) ===
No. overall	No. in series	Title	Original release date
48	1	"Pig in a Poke"	5 September 1993
After Lovejoy sells some antique prints to the wife of a wealthy pig breeder, Eric discovers a stolen statue hidden at the man's house. The police suspect Lovejoy of involvement and he decides to return the statue to its rightful owner - no less than the Queen.
49	2	"Who Is the Fairest of Them All?"	12 September 1993
The head of a ballet school asks Lovejoy to replace an antique mirror, which leads him into a money-making scheme with an eccentric restorer. Discovering that Lord Felsham is bankrupt, Jane has to put Felsham Hall up for sale and then she leaves for a job in America.
50	3	"A Going Concern"	19 September 1993
While Felsham Hall is up for sale Lovejoy takes the opportunity to use it as an antiques showroom, much to the annoyance of the auctioneer, Charlotte Cavendish. He also gets mixed up in a scam involving an aristocratic woman, her greedy son and his mistress.
51	4	"The Kakiemon Tiger"	26 September 1993
A vicious loan shark gives Lovejoy five days to pay off a large debt. As he sets about acquiring antiques to pay the debt, Lovejoy finds a valuable Japanese statue that may be the solution to his problem, but needs to use some trickery to ensure that he gets it at auction.
52	5	"Three Men and a Brittle Lady"	3 October 1993
When Charlie Gimbert is swindled and Charlotte is burgled, Lovejoy agrees to help catch those involved. His investigations lead him to an antiques dealer and her forger boyfriend. He also discovers that a local shop owner is linked to the burglary and sets a trap.
53	6	"Ducking and Diving"	10 October 1993
Lumbered with some furniture that he cannot sell, Lovejoy stores it in a pub owned by Eric's Uncle Jack, who is connected to a smuggling ring importing stolen furniture. Lovejoy is falsely suspected by the police of being part of the ring and is forced to clear his name.
54	7	"Stones of Destiny"	17 October 1993
When eccentric dealer Bible Joe steals a Celtic cross from Charlotte's auction house, Lovejoy and Charlotte head to the Welsh coast in pursuit. They discover the cross is a relic from an ancient chapel hidden in nearby caves and that a mysterious society is trying to locate it.
55	8	"Poetic Licence"	24 October 1993
A friend of Charlotte's needs to raise money to stop the care home that she runs from closing. Lovejoy's attention is drawn to a bureau whose owner insists is worth a fortune, but has a part missing. While trying to find it, he discovers a connection to a famous poet.
56	9	"The Peking Gun"	31 October 1993
After discovering a rare antique cannon among the possessions of Charlie Gimbert's latest flame, Lovejoy and Charlotte find themselves at the centre of a war between two rival Chinese gangs who are fighting over possession of it.
57	10	"Goose Bumps"	7 November 1993
Lovejoy agrees to help the widow of an antiques dealer who apparently drowned at sea. He finds a pair of statues that were owned by the man and arranges to sell them to an eccentric collector. Matters become complicated when the dead man is found alive and well.
58	11	"Swings and Roundabouts"	14 November 1993
While a travelling funfair is in town, a wealthy family is burgled. The police suspect the leader of the carnival of involvement but Lovejoy, who is trying to sell the man's collection of candlesticks, thinks otherwise. He finds that it is all part of an insurance fraud.
59	12	"Never Judge a Book by its Cover"	21 November 1993
While looking for antique books for Charlie, Lovejoy comes across a valuable bible owned by two elderly sisters and their brother. The sisters need money but their brother refuses to sell. When Lovejoy finds the bible is a fake, he has to find a real one to replace it.
60	13	"The Price of Fish"	28 November 1993
After spending a weekend at the country home of one of Charlotte's friends, Lovejoy discovers the apparently wealthy owners are in financial trouble. He offers to help by selling a mounted fish. Meanwhile Lovejoy also has to thwart Charlie's plans for Felsham Hall.
61	14	"The Lost Colony"	27 December 1993
When a descendant of Sir Walter Raleigh sells his home and its contents, Lovejoy meets an American woman whose name is also Lovejoy. Several antiques go missing along with the woman and Lovejoy tracks them back to North Carolina. Lovejoy discovers that the woman and her brother are operating a scam to claim an inheritance. The pair get Lovejoy put in jail, but Charlotte arrives to help him and together they set about bringing the Americans to justice.

=== Series 6 (1994) ===
No. overall	No. in series	Title	Original release date
62	1	"Fair Exchange"	2 October 1994
Charlotte buys a valuable painting which is then stolen from her home and Lovejoy is accused of the theft. He had spent the night with the former owner and cannot remember anything. Realising that he has been set up, he investigates and sets a trap to catch the real thieves.
63	2	"Day of Reckoning"	9 October 1994
A former dealer is released from prison after serving time for the murder of his wife, who he wrongly believed was having an affair with Lovejoy. The man kidnaps Charlotte and leaves Lovejoy a series of cryptic clues to solve before a deadline in order to prevent her death.
64	3	"Somewhere - Over the Rainbow?"	16 October 1994
After Tinker disappears, Lovejoy tracks him down to a hotel in Devon owned by his sister, Olive, played by Ursula Howells. She is in financial trouble and faces losing the hotel to a local developer. Vowing to help, Lovejoy goes on the trail of smuggler's treasure but finds some valuable antiques instead.
65	4	"Double Edged Sword"	23 October 1994
A gangster coerces Lovejoy into recovering a rare Japanese sword that was stolen from his home. Lovejoy's old mentor Jim Leonard outbids him for it at auction. A mysterious woman then steals the sword from Jim. Lovejoy discovers she is the gangster's daughter.
66	5	"Guns and Roses"	30 October 1994
When Lovejoy takes an antique gun for repair, he discovers a local villain is trying to obtain the gunsmith's shop. The villain frames Lovejoy for an armed robbery and implicates the shop owner too. Lovejoy is let off and helps the shop owner by selling an antique gun.
67	6	"The Last of the Uzkoks"	6 November 1994
An aristocrat asks Charlotte to auction a Greek religious artefact. When a priest appears and claims to own it, she asks Lovejoy to determine its provenance. Other people also claim ownership and Lovejoy takes the opportunity to sell his services to them all.
68	7	"Breaking the Broker"	13 November 1994
The police coerce Lovejoy into helping them catch a ship's captain who is smuggling antiques from Poland. When Lovejoy discovers a local pawnbroker is involved his loyalties are tested, but after Tinker is hospitalised Lovejoy decides to help put the pawnbroker away.
69	8	"Fruit of the Desert"	20 November 1994
Lovejoy buys Middle Eastern antiques from a retired diplomat, only to discover that the man is a fraud and the antiques are stolen. He borrowed the money to buy them from a loan shark using his daughter's flat as collateral and has to find a way to get out of the debt.
70	9	"Holding the Baby"	27 November 1994
Lovejoy buys a kitchen dresser on the cheap and intends to restore and sell it but a rival dealer steals the dresser from an unsuspecting Beth. Lovejoy tracks it down to London, where Charlotte ends up locked inside the rival's shop while minding a friend's baby.
71	10	"Last Tango in Lavenham"	4 December 1994
Lovejoy proposes marriage to Charlotte when she considers leaving for New York. He also discovers his bank manager is linked to a robbery at an archaeological dig nearby. Lovejoy's wedding is all set but plans are interrupted by a man who wants to buy Felsham Hall and the return of Jane.
