= Thornleigh Salesian College =

School in Bolton, Greater Manchester, England

Location
- Sharples Park; Astley Bridge; Bolton, Greater Manchester; England; 53.601347°N 2.443703°W

Information
- Type: Voluntary aided secondary school
- Motto: Sicut Cervus (Latin incipit of Psalm 42, meaning "As the hart [longs for running water, So longs my soul for you, O God]")
- Religious affiliation: Roman Catholic
- Established: 1925
- Founder: Salesians of Don Bosco
- Sister school: Canon Slade School
- Local authority: Bolton
- Department for Education URN: 105264 Tables
- Ofsted: Reports
- Headteacher: Mike Fitzsimons
- Gender: Coeducational
- Age: 11 to 18
- Enrolment: 1506
- Houses: Alpha, Beta, Gamma, Delta, Zeta, Kappa, Theta, Sigma, Omega, Lambda
- Website: http://www.thornleigh.bolton.sch.uk/

Thornleigh Salesian College is a Roman Catholic secondary school in the Astley Bridge area of Bolton in Greater Manchester, England.

== History ==
Thornleigh College was originally a boys school founded in 1925 by the Salesians of Don Bosco at the request of the Clergy of Bolton. The school uniform (blazer) was brown with the school badge picked out in yellow on the breast pocket.

It became a direct grant grammar school catering for a wide area in Lancashire. In 1980, following the reorganisation of Catholic schools in Bolton to a comprehensive system, Thornleigh joined with St Anne's High School, to form a six form entry Voluntary Aided Mixed Comprehensive School with a Sixth Form Centre to serve the needs of all Catholic Sixth Form pupils. Catholic Secondary Schools in Bolton reorganised again in 1986, and Thornleigh combined with St Cuthbert's school, which had been founded in 1963, to form a new seven form entry Voluntary Aided Mixed Comprehensive School with a Sixth Form centre which continues to serve the whole of the borough. The school is under the Trusteeship of the Salesians of Don Bosco. The school now celebrates Don Bosco day on 31 January as was the tradition since the founding of the school.

For ten years from 1980 Thornleigh was a split site school. £4 million of investment in new buildings in the years 1986 to 1989 enabled the whole school to consolidate at Sharples Park from September 1990. A new building for the Sixth Form was opened in 1987 and an £800,000 extension was added to it in 1995. A five class room extension for 11-16 pupils plus a new two storey dining room, costing £1.1 million in total, were added during 2000. In 2005, Thornleigh received a Sports College and Investor in People status.

On the same site is the Thornleigh Sixth Form. As of 2012, there were 1,624 students at Thornleigh, with 375 studying at the Sixth Form.

== Badge and motto ==
The Latin Motto "Sicut Cervus" is the incipit of Psalm 42, and can be loosely translated as 'As the Hart'. The motto is that of the Hargreaves family, and the head of a hart (a male deer) was the family crest. The crest is worn on the blazers of every student.

The Hargreaves were a wealthy Bolton family who owned the house at Sharples Park which was bought by the Salesians when Thornleigh was founded in 1925. The crest and motto were kept by the school and the school took its name from the house.

== Notable former pupils ==
- Danny Boyle, film director-producer
- Brian Finch, television scriptwriter and dramatist
- Helen Flanagan, actress, model and TV personality
- Stuart Flinders, journalist, broadcaster and author
- Badly Drawn Boy (born Damon Michael Gough), indie singer-songwriter and multi-instrumentalist
- John Grant, novelist, known for the Lovejoy series
- Edmund Hester, cricketer and educator
- Danny Jones, member of the band McFly
- Maurice Lindsay, chief executive of the Rugby Football League and chairman of Wigan Warriors
- Paul Mason, television correspondent (Channel 4)
- Lee Mason, Premier League referee
- Ruth Madeley, actress
- Paul Moulden, retired footballer for Manchester City
- Mike Pollitt, retired goalkeeper
- Jenny Ryan, TV Personality
- Tom Parker (singer), singer, member of The Wanted
- Hannah Spencer, MP for Gorton and Denton
- Helen Wood, television personality, columnist and former escort
