= Edmund Hester =

English cricketer (born 1967)

Personal information
- Full name: Edmund Dominic Hester
- Born: 23 August 1967 (age 59); Radcliffe, Lancashire, England
- Batting: Right-handed
- Bowling: Left-arm medium

Domestic team information
- Years: Team
- 1989: Oxford University

Career statistics
Competition	First-class
Matches	5
Runs scored	16
Batting average	3.20
100s/50s	–/–
Top score	5
Balls bowled	942
Wickets	11
Bowling average	52.00
5 wickets in innings	–
10 wickets in match	–
Best bowling	4/100
Catches/stumpings	–/–
- Source: Cricinfo, 4 May 2020

Edmund Dominic Hester (born 23 August 1967) is an English educator and former first-class cricketer.

Hester was born at Radcliffe in August 1967. He was educated at Thornleigh Salesian College, before going up to Brasenose College, Oxford. While studying at Oxford, he played first-class cricket for Oxford University in 1989, making five appearances. Playing as a left-arm medium pace bowler, he took 11 wickets at an average of 52.00 and with best figures of 4 for 100. After graduating from Oxford, he became a schoolteacher. He is the current headmaster of Princethorpe College.
