= One More Time (Kay Starr album) =

Compilation album by Kay Starr
- Released: 1960
- Genre: Pop, jazz
- Label: Capitol

Kay Starr chronology
Losers, Weepers (1960)	One More Time (1960)	Kay Starr: Jazz Singer (1960)

One More Time is a compilation album by Kay Starr. It was released in 1960 by Capitol Records (catalog no. T-1358).

Professional ratings
Review scores
Source	Rating
Billboard	4/4 stars
AllMusic	2/5 stars

Upon the album's release, Billboard magazine gave it the highest rating of four stars and wrote: "Miss Starr is in fine, vibrant vocal form on a group of nostalgic standards and oldies. Selections -- all first-rate jockey material -- reflecting a flock of moods."

AllMusic later gave the album a rating of two stars.

== Track listing ==
Side A

1. "Side by Side"
2. "So Tired" (Jack Stuart / Russ Morgan)
3. "I'm the Lonesomest Gal in Town" (Albert Von Tilzer / Lew Brown)
4. "Changing Partners"
5. "Fortune in Dreams" (Hal Stanley / Irving Taylor)
6. "Swamp Fire" (Hal Mooney)

Side B

1. "I'll Always Be in Love with You"
2. "Two Brothers" (Irving Gordon)
3. "The Breeze" (Tony Sacco / Dick Smith / Al Lewis)
4. "Noah!" (Hal Stanley / Irving Taylor)
5. "Hold Me, Hold Me, Hold Me" (Jule Styne / Betty Comden / Adolph Green)
6. "Kay's Lament" (Hal Stanley)
