= John Grant (novelist) =

English writer

- Born: September 30, 1933 (age 92); Bolton, England
- Occupation: Writer
- Writing career
- Pen name: Graham Gaunt; Jonathan Gash; Jonathan Grant
- Notable work: Lovejoy

John Grant (born 1933), professionally known under pen name Jonathan Gash, is an English doctor and writer, best known as the author of the Lovejoy series that was adapted to television by Ian La Frenais He has also written under the names Graham Gaunt and Jonathan Grant.

== Biography ==
Born in Bolton, Lancashire, Grant was educated at St Peter and St Paul's Primary School, then Thornleigh College, before studying medicine and qualifying as a doctor. He served in the British Army, attaining the rank of Major in the Royal Army Medical Corps, and has also worked as a general practitioner and as a pathologist. Between 1971 and 1988 he was director of bacteriology at the London School of Hygiene and Tropical Medicine of the University of London.

Grant won the John Creasey Award in 1977 for his first Lovejoy novel, The Judas Pair. He is also the author of a series of medical thrillers featuring the character Dr Clare Burtonall, and a novel, The Incomer, as Graham Gaunt. He has also published work in the periodical Postscripts.

Grant lives near Colchester in Essex, the setting for many of his novels.

== Bibliography ==
His Lovejoy novels, written as Jonathan Gash, include:

- The Judas Pair (1977)
- Gold By Gemini (1978)
- The Grail Tree (1979)
- Spend Game (1980)
- The Vatican Rip (1981)
- Firefly Gadroon (1982)
- The Sleepers of Erin (1983)
- The Gondola Scam (1984)
- Pearlhanger (1985)
- The Tartan Ringers (1986) a.k.a. The Tartan Sell
- Moonspender (1986)
- Jade Woman (1988)
- The Very Last Gambado (1989)
- The Great California Game (1991)
- The Lies of Fair Ladies (1992)
- Paid and Loving Eyes (1993)
- The Sin Within Her Smile (1993)
- The Grace in Older Women (1995)
- The Possessions of a Lady (1995)
- The Rich and the Profane (1998)
- A Rag, a Bone and a Hank of Hair (1999)
- Every Last Cent (2001)
- Ten Word Game (2003)
- Faces in the Pool (2008)
- Lovejoy at Large (omnibus) (1991)
- Lovejoy at Large Again (omnibus) (1993)
- Lovejoy Omnibus (omnibus) (1997)

His Dr. Clare Burtonall series, also written as Jonathan Gash, includes:

- Different Women Dancing (1997)
- Prey Dancing (1998)
- Die Dancing (2000)
- Bone Dancing (2002)
- Blood Dancing (2006)

Other novels written as Jonathan Gash include:

- The Year of the Woman (2004)
- Finding Davey (2005)
- Bad Girl Magdalene (2007)
- Preddy Boy (2013)

Novels written as Jonathan Grant include the Mehala of Sealandings series:

- The Shores of Sealandings (1991)
- Storms at Sealandings (1992)
- Mehala Lady of Sealandings (1994)
- Bring Flowers of the Fairest (2012)
- Velvet Walks (2012)

== Sources ==
- "Jonathan Gash". fantasticfiction.com.

Footnotes
