= Wogdon & Barton =

English gunsmith

- Founder: Robert Wogdon
- Headquarters: London, England

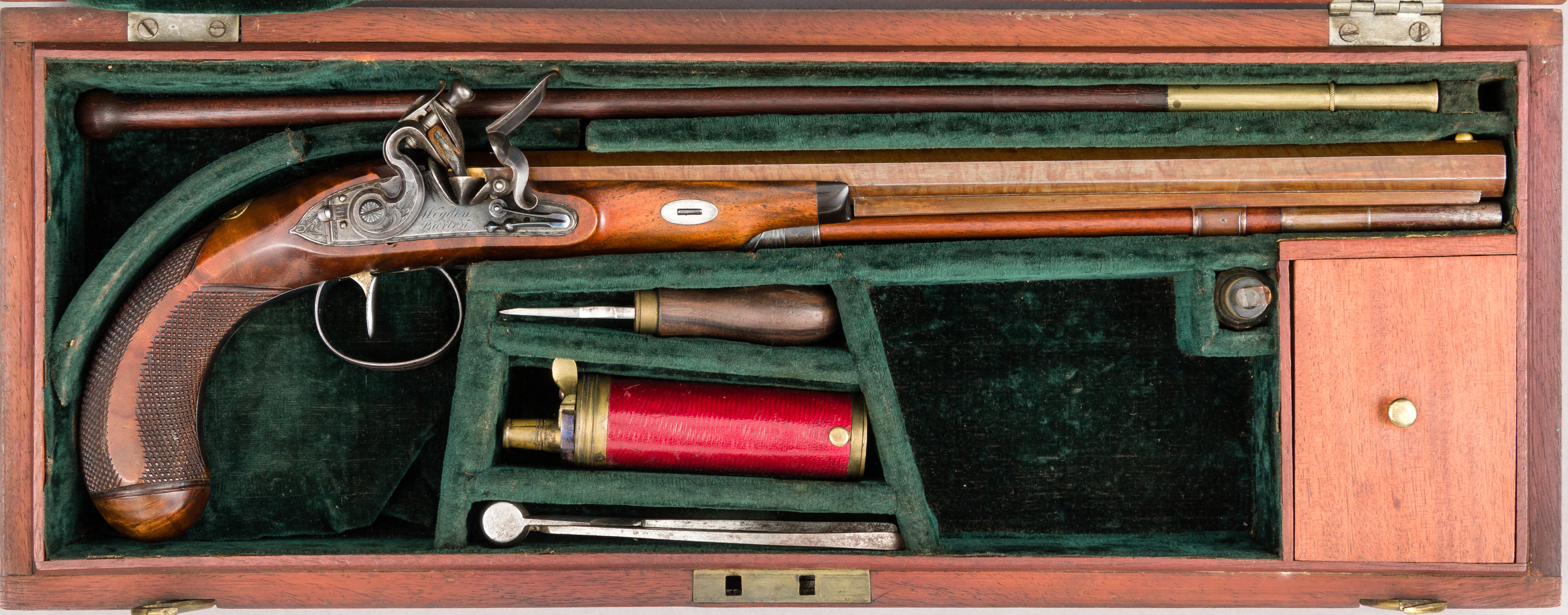
A Wogdon & Barton target pistol c.1801-3, with its case and accessories. Owned by Prince William Frederick, Duke of Gloucester and Edinburgh, Metropolitan Museum of Art, accession number:37.154.3a–g

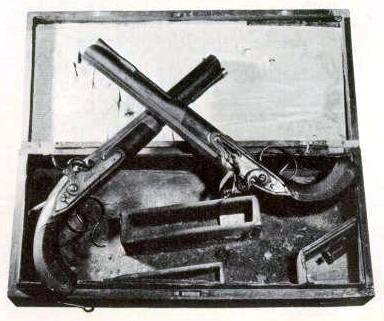
Wogdon & Barton dueling pistols

Wogdon & Barton (founded by Robert Wogdon) was an 18th-century firm of gunsmiths based in London, England. Robert Wogdon produced flintlock firearms from the 1760s, and was particularly well known for his high quality duelling pistols. The name Wogdon became synonymous with dueling, to the extent that duels in England were sometimes referred to as "a Wogdon affair". Wogdon had apprenticed to the Irish gunmaker Edward Norton in Lincolnshire. Wogdon formed a partnership in 1794 with John Barton, after which their pistols were signed Wogdon and Barton. Wogdon retired in 1803 and died in 1813.

Wogdon made the pistols used in the infamous Burr–Hamilton duel, which were later claimed to have concealed "hair triggers" (also known as set triggers). These gave the person using them an advantage over their opponent by reducing the amount of finger pressure required to fire the pistol, which greatly increased accuracy of the shot. However, for at least twenty years before the Burr–Hamilton duel, English duelling pistols by all the top makers had been customarily fitted with set triggers. Wogdon's duelling pistols were fitted with set triggers as a standard feature, so they cannot be regarded as "secret" devices that other duellists of the era would be completely unaware of.

Robert Wogdon (January 1734 - 28 March 1813) died aged 79 and was buried with his wife Jane (died 15 February 1805, aged 69) in the chancel of St Bartholomew's Church, located on the outskirts of Buntingford, Hertfordshire.
