= Can-Can (musical) =

- Original Cast Recording
- Music: Cole Porter
- Lyrics: Cole Porter
- Book: Abe Burrows
- Productions: 1953 Broadway; 1954 West End; 1960 Film version 1981 Broadway revival 1988 West End revival

Can-Can is a musical with music and lyrics by Cole Porter, and a book by Abe Burrows. The story concerns the showgirls of the Montmartre dance halls during the 1890s.

The original Broadway production ran for over two years beginning in 1953, and the 1954 West End production was also a success. Gwen Verdon, in only her second Broadway role, and choreographer Michael Kidd won Tony Awards and were praised, but both the score and book received tepid reviews, and revivals generally have not fared well.

== Production history ==
After the pre-Broadway tryout at the Shubert Theatre in Philadelphia in March 1953, Can-Can premiered on Broadway at the Shubert Theatre on May 7, 1953, and closed on June 25, 1955 after 892 performances. The original production, which Burrows also directed, starred Lilo as La Mome, Hans Conried as Boris, Peter Cookson as the judge, Gwen Verdon as Claudine, Dania Krupska, Phil Leeds, Dee Dee Wood, and Erik Rhodes as Hilaire. Michael Kidd was the choreographer, Porter's music was arranged and orchestrated by Philip J. Lang. According to Ben Brantley, Claudine was "the part that made Gwen Verdon a star."

The West End production premiered at the Coliseum Theatre on October 14, 1954, and ran for 394 performances. Restaged by Jerome Whyte, the cast included Irene Hilda (La Mome), Edmund Hockridge (Aristide), Alfred Marks (Boris), Gillian Lynne (Claudine) and Warren Mitchell (Theophile).

A Broadway revival was attempted in 1977 starring film actress Leslie Caron and John Stewart. Produced by Robert Young, E.Michael Crowley, Robert D'Angelo and Jane Friedlander the production closed after ten only modestly successful weeks on the road.

A Broadway revival opened April 30, 1981 at the Minskoff Theatre and closed after five performances and sixteen previews. It was directed by Burrows with choreography by Roland Petit and starred Zizi Jeanmaire. Frank Rich wrote: "...mediocre material, no matter how it's sliced, is still mediocre material. 'Can-Can' never was a first rate musical, and now, almost three decades after its original production, it stands on even shakier legs."

A 1983 outdoor production played at The Muny in St. Louis, starring Judy Kaye, John Reardon, John Schuck, Lawrence Leritz, Lorene Yarnell and Beth Leavel to excellent reviews. The St. Louis Post-Dispatch noted "Can-Can opened in dazzling style, reminiscent of the Muny glory days, weaving a magic spell. Judy Kaye offers a robust, sassy Pistache. She's glorious. Leritz and Yarnell are teamed in exciting style. The dancing is fabulous."

The London revival at the Strand Theatre ran from October 26, 1988 through January 21, 1989. David Taylor directed, with choreography by Kenn Oldfield, with a cast that featured Donna McKechnie (Mme. Pistache), Bernard Alane, Norman Warwick, Janie Dee (Claudine) and Milo O'Shea. Producer Lovett Bickford explained that "his version was less a revival than a complete revision. 'For all intents and purposes, this is a new show,' he said." It had a revised book which incorporated songs from Fifty Million Frenchmen, Nymph Errant, Silk Stockings, Out of This World and other Cole Porter musicals.

Also in 1988, an international tour starred Chita Rivera and Ron Holgate. The tour featured the Radio City Music Hall Rockettes. This production was directed by Dallett Norris, with choreography by Alan Johnson.

In 2004, a City Center Encores! staged concert production featured Patti LuPone as La Mome Pistache, Michael Nouri (Judge Aristide Forestier), Charlotte d'Amboise (Claudine), David Costabile (Theophile), David Hibbard (Hercule), Michael Goldstrom (Etienne), Reg Rogers, and Eli Wallach. This production was directed by Lonny Price, Choreography by Melinda Roy; additional musical staging by Casey Nicholaw, with sets by John Lee Beatty and lighting by Kenneth Posner.

A 2007 production at the Pasadena Playhouse in California used a rewritten book by Joel Fields and David Lee, who also directed. Lee and Fields created a back story for the protagonists, tightened the plot, and reintroduced a song that had been cut from the original ("Who Said Gay Paree?"). The cast featured Michelle Duffy and Kevin Earley, and the production received critical praise for Patti Colombo's choreography, Steve Orich's new orchestrations and scenic design by Roy Christopher.

== Plot ==
In Paris in 1893, the dance-hall in Montmartre owned by La Môme Pistache, Bal du Paradis, is being threatened with closing by a self-righteous judge, Aristide Forestier. He is offended by the scandalous but popular dance that the attractive dancers perform at the dance-hall, the "Can-Can." The judge sends the police to harass the owner and dancers, but the police like the dancers so much that they are reluctant to testify against them in court. The judge decides to gather evidence himself, and takes a trip to the club. Once there, he and the owner, La Môme, fall in love. He tries to keep his identity a secret but the girls recognize him. He sees the Can-Can and gets photographic evidence of its scandalousness. La Môme and the dancers are sent to jail.

One of the dancers, Claudine, a laundry girl by day, has been pursued by Hilaire, an art critic, who plans to host an elaborate ball at the club. Claudine, who loves a sculptor, Boris, arranges to have dinner with Hilaire so that her sculptor will receive a favourable review. Now, with the proprietress and dancers locked up, the ball cannot go forward. The judge is struggling with the conflict between his moral scruples and his love for La Môme. Eventually, he concedes that "obscenity is in the eye of the beholder". He urges her to escape, but a journalist gets a photograph of him kissing her – a scandal for him!

Hilaire criticises Boris's sculptures, and the cowardly artist manages to challenge the critic to a duel before fainting. Eventually, Hilaire writes a gushing review of Boris's work. Judge Aristide loses his judgeship and is disbarred, but La Môme and the girls all go to court with him and all win their cases.

== Musical numbers ==
Act I

- "Introduction"
- "Maidens Typical of France" – Company
- "Never Give Anything Away" – La Môme Pistache
- "C'est Magnifique" – Pistache and Judge Aristide Forestier
- "Quadrille"
- "Come Along with Me" – Hilaire Jussac
- "Come Along with Me" (reprise) - Boris Adzinidzinadze
- "Live and Let Live" – Pistache
- "I Am in Love" – Judge
- "If You Loved Me Truly" – Claudine and Boris
- "Montmart'" – Company
- "Garden of Eden Ballet"
- "Allez-Vous-En" – Pistache

Act II

- "Entr'acte"
- "Who Said Gay Paree?" – Judge (cut out of town)
- "Never, Never Be an Artist" – Boris and Company
- "It's All Right with Me" – Judge
- "Every Man Is a Stupid Man" – Pistache
- "The Apaches" (dance)
- "I Love Paris" – Pistache and Company
- "Can-Can" – Pistache and Women
- "Finale" – Company

== Critical response ==
Brooks Atkinson of The New York Times wrote: "Mr. Porter and Mr. Burrows are fascinated by the wickedness of Montmartre in the Nineties. But it is Mr. Kidd, the choreographer, who makes real theatre out of revelry in the dance halls. He and his dancers are dry and satirical about it, and also enormously expert in their performing...With Gwen Verdon leading the ballets with impudence, recklessness and humor, the dancing is spectacular." In a later article, Atkinson, in the New York Times commented: "No doubt the ballet has become the major entertainment medium in "Can-Can" by default. For Cole Porter's score is not one of his best works, and Abe Burrows' book is old-fashioned and pedestrian."

== Awards and nominations ==
=== Original 1953 production ===
Tony Awards

- Best Featured Actress in a Musical - Gwen Verdon [winner]
- Best Choreography - Michael Kidd [winner]

Theatre World Award

- Gwen Verdon [winner]

=== 1981 revival ===
Tony Awards

- Best Scenic Design - David Mitchell [nominee]
- Best Costume Design - Franca Squarciapino [nominee]
- Best Choreography - Roland Petit [nominee]
