= Swingin' with the Starr =

Compilation album by Kay Starr
- Released: 1956
- Genre: Pop, jazz
- Label: Liberty

Professional ratings
Review scores
Source	Rating
AllMusic	2/5 stars

Swingin' with the Starr, also known as Swinging with the Starr: Kay Starr Swings, is a compilation album of 16 songs recorded by Kay Starr. It was released in September 1956 by Liberty Records (catalog no. SL-9001). The recordings feature Starr singing with the Jazz All Stars.

AllMusic later gave the album a rating of two stars. Reviewer Steve Goulding called it "high-toned swing in a variety of jazzy settings" and noted that Starr "manages to be both polished and intimate."

The album was released on compact disc in 2008. The original song sequence was altered, and some tracks were omitted and others added.

== Track listing ==
Side A

1. "Stardust"
2. "Honeysuckle Rose" [2:11]
3. "Baby, Won't You Please Come Home" [2:17]
4. "I'm Confessin' (That I Love You)" [2:52]
5. "Who's Foolin' Who"
6. "St. Louis Blues" [2:42]
7. "Stormy Weather" [2:56]
8. "Sunday" [3:06]

Side B

1. "Sweet Lorraine" [2:02]
2. "After You've Gone" [2:45]
3. "I Cried for You" [2:41]
4. "There's a Lull in My Life" [2:16]
5. "Where or When"
6. "Love Me or Leave Me" [2:52]
7. "All of Me" [2:26]
8. "Dixieland Band"

Bonus tracks on 2008 reissue

1. "There's Yes, Yes in Your Eyes"
2. "Nobody's Sweetheart Now"
3. "Honeymoon (The Waning Honeymoon)"
4. "More I Cannot Wish You"
5. "Three Letters"
6. "If Anyone Finds This (I Love You)"
