= Allez-Vous-En =

"Allez-Vous-En" (Go away, in French (Note: Allez-vous-en is a French imperative sentence meaning Go away directed to one or more persons, the phrase being formed using the reflexive conjugated form of the verb aller which means to go, and the object pronoun en.)) is a popular song. It was written by Cole Porter and was published in 1953.

The song was featured in the musical Can-Can when it was introduced by the French actress Lilo.

A recording by Kay Starr was the song's most successful version, commercially. This recording was released by Capitol Records as catalog number 2464. It first reached the Billboard Best Seller chart on June 27, 1953, and lasted nine weeks on the chart, peaking at number 13. This was one side of a two-sided hit; the flip side was "Half a Photograph", an even bigger hit.

== Other versions ==
- Gordon Jenkins and his Orchestra recorded an orchestral version in 1953.
- Teddy Johnson recorded the song for Columbia Records in 1954.
- Nelson Riddle and his orchestra included an orchestral version in the album Can Can (1960).
- Bing Crosby also recorded the song in 1960 for his album El Señor Bing.
