= Half a Photograph =

Song
- Published: 1952
- Composer: Harold Stanley
- Lyricist: Bob Russell

"Half a Photograph" is a popular song. The music was written by Harold Stanley, the lyrics by Bob Russell. The song was published in 1952 (or 1953; sources differ).

The biggest hit version was recorded by Kay Starr. This recording was released by Capitol Records as catalog number 2464. It first reached the Billboard magazine Best Seller chart on June 6, 1953 and lasted 12 weeks on the chart, peaking at #10. This was one side of a two-sided hit; the flip side was "Allez-Vous-En," which also charted that year.
