= The Kay Starr Style =

Studio album by Kay Starr
- Released: 1953
- Genre: Pop
- Label: Capitol

Kay Starr chronology
The Kay Starr Style (1953)	In a Blue Mood (1955)

Professional ratings
Review scores
Source	Rating
AllMusic	2/5 stars

The Kay Starr Style is a studio album by Kay Starr. It was released in 1953 by Capitol Records (catalog no. H-363). The album included Starr's No. 3 pop hit, "Side by Side". Originally issued as a 10-inch LP with eight songs, it was reissued in 1955 as a 12-inch album with four additional tracks.

Upon its release, Billboard magazine wrote: "[O]n this bright and lively waxing the lusty, saucy Kay shows how she can inject new life and new meaning into a group of standards. The songs range from torchy ballads to rollicking novelties, and on all of them the thrush is home from the moment she rips into the first four bars. The wonderful work by Harold Mooney adds much to the platter."

AllMusic later gave the album a rating of two stars.

== Track listing ==
Side A

1. "Side by Side" (Harry M. Woods) – 2:53
2. "It's the Talk of the Town" (Al J. Neiburg, Jerry Livingston, Marty Symes) – 3:11
3. "Waiting at the End of the Road" (Irving Berlin) – 2:13
4. "I Just Couldn't Take It Baby" (Alberta Nichols, Mann Holiner) – 2:52

Side B

1. "The Breeze (That's Bringing' My Honey Back to Me)" (Tony Sacco / Dick Smith / Al Lewis) – 2:33
2. "Tonight You Belong to Me" (Billy Rose, Lee David) – 2:41
3. "Too Busy!" (Chester Conn, Ned Miller) – 1:52
4. "What Can I Say After I Say I'm Sorry?" (Abe Lyman, Walter Donaldson) – 1:52

Bonus tracks from 1955 reissue

1. "I've Got the World on a String" (Harold Arlen / Ted Koehler) – 1:50
2. "When My Dream Boat Comes Home" (Dave Franklin / Cliff Friend) – 2:20
3. "Please Be Kind" (Saul Chaplin / Sammy Cahn) – 2:47
4. "Someday Sweetheart" (John & Benjamin Spikes) – 2:32
