= The One, The Only Kay Starr =

Studio album by Kay Starr
- Released: 1956
- Genre: Pop
- Label: RCA Victor

Kay Starr chronology
In a Blue Mood (1955)	The One, The Only Kay Starr (1956)	Blue Starr (1957)

The One, The Only Kay Starr is a studio album by Kay Starr. It was released in 1956 by RCA Victor (catalog no. LPM-1149). It was her first album for RCA Victor after a decade with Capitol Records.

== Reception ==
Professional ratings
Review scores
Source	Rating
AllMusic	3/5 stars

Upon its release, Billboard magazine wrote: "A collection of a dozen standards that Kay Starr has not recorded previously, done in her characteristic style: earthy, blues-touched, sung from the heart."

AllMusic gave the album a rating of three stars. Reviewer William Ruhlmann wrote that, with her "rhythmic, emotive vocal performances", and interpretations tending toward jump blues and rhythm & blues, she came off as "another significant pre-rock progenitor"."

== Track listing ==
Side A

1. "A Hundred Years from Today"
2. "Wrap Your Troubles in Dreams"
3. "Glad Rag Doll"
4. "Fit as a Fiddle"
5. "My Buddy"
6. "You Can Depend On Me"

Side B

1. "I Want a Little Boy" (Murray Mencher / Billy Moll) (rewording of the original, "I Want a Little Girl")
2. "I'll Never Say 'Never Again' Again" (Harry M. Woods)
3. "The Prisoner's Song"
4. "Once More" (Hal Stanley / Raymond Karl)
5. "Georgia on My Mind"
6. "Jump for Joy" (Duke Ellington / Sid Kuller / Paul Francis Webster)
