= I Cry by Night =

Studio album by Kay Starr
- Released: 1962
- Genre: Pop
- Label: Capitol

Kay Starr chronology
I Cry by Night (1962)	Just Plain Country (1962)

I Cry by Night is a studio album by Kay Starr. It was released in 1962 by Capitol Records (catalog no. T-1681). In 2014, Universal Music Group made the album available on YouTube with 24 bit mastering.

Professional ratings
Review scores
Source	Rating
Billboard	4/4 stars
AllMusic	2/5 stars
New Record Mirror	4/5 stars

Upon its release, Billboard magazine gave the album its highest rating of four stars and wrote: "Kay Starr sings from the heart here, backed by an instrumental group that contributes a jazz feeling to the package."

AllMusic later gave the album a rating of two stars.

== Track listing ==
Side A

1. "I'm Alone Because I Love You" (Ira Schuster / Bob Miller / Joe Young)
2. "I Cry by Night" (Marvin Fisher / Jack Segal)
3. "Baby Won't You Please Come Home"
4. "More Than You Know"
5. "Lover Man (Oh, Where Can You Be?)"
6. "My Kinda Love"

Side B

1. "It Had to Be You"
2. "Whispering Grass"
3. "Nevertheless"
4. "What Do You See In Her?" (Hal David / Frank Weldon)
5. "P.S. I Love You"
6. "I'm Still in Love with You" (T-Bone Walker)
