= Kay Starr: Jazz Singer =

Studio album by Kay Starr
- Released: 1960
- Genre: Pop, jazz
- Label: Capitol
- Producer: Dave Cavanaugh

Kay Starr chronology
One More Time (1960)	Kay Starr: Jazz Singer (1960)

Kay Starr: Jazz Singer is a studio album by Kay Starr. It was released in 1960 by Capitol Records (catalog no. T-1438). It was produced by Dave Cavanaugh, and the music was arranged and conducted by Van Alexander.

Professional ratings
Review scores
Source	Rating
AllMusic	4/5 stars

AllMusic also gave the album a rating of four stars. Reviewer Dave Nathan wrote that Starr "swings a set of 12 songs" and "this album helps document her place as a top-flight jazz vocalist."

== Track listing ==
Side A

1. "I Never Knew (I Could Love Anybody)" (Egan, Marsh, Pitts, Whiteman) [2:42]
2. "My Man" (Charles, Pollack, Willemetz, Yvain) [2:36]
3. "Breezin' Along with the Breeze" (Gillespie, Simons, Whiting) [1:52]
4. "All by Myself" (Irving Berlin) [3:00]
5. "Hard Hearted Hannah" (Ager, Bates, Bigelow, Yellen) [2:29]
6. "Me Too (Ho-Ho! Ha-Ha!)" (Sherman, Tobias, Woods) [1:58]

Side B

1. "Happy Days and Lonely Nights" (Fisher, Rose) [2:48]
2. "I Only Want a Buddy -- Not a Sweetheart" (Eddie Jones) [3:09]
3. "Hummin' to Myself" (Fain, Magidson, Siegel, Siegel) [2:55]
4. "My Honey's Lovin' Arms" (Meyer, Ruby) [2:45]
5. "Sunday" (Jule Styne / Ned Miller / Chester Conn / Benny Kreuger) [3:04]
6. "I Would Do Anything for You" (Hill, Hopkins, Williams) [2:48]
