= Rockin' with Kay =

Studio album by Kay Starr
- Released: 1958
- Genre: Pop
- Label: RCA Victor

Kay Starr chronology
Blue Starr (1957)	Rockin' with Kay (1958)	Movin'! (1959)

Rockin' with Kay is a studio album by Kay Starr. It was released in 1958 by RCA Victor (catalog no. LPM-1720). It was her third album for RCA Victor.

== Reception ==
Professional ratings
Review scores
Source	Rating
Billboard	3/4 stars
AllMusic	3/5 stars

Upon its release, Billboard magazine gave the album a rating of three stars and wrote: "The wonderful, husky expressiveness of the Starr gal comes through on this selection of tunes arranged for rocking delivery."

AllMusic also gave the album a rating of three stars. Reviewer William Ruhlmann wrote that the arrangements were "bluesy and rocking" and that Starr sang with "her usual throaty abandon."

== Track listing ==
Side A

1. "Dry Bones" (traditional) [2:30]
2. "Rockin' Chair" (Hoagy Carmichael) [3:20]
3. "I Gotta Get Away from You" (Hal Stanley) [1:57]
4. "Till We Meet Again" (Raymond B. Egan, Richard A. Whiting) [2:27]
5. "True Blue Lou" (Sam Coslow, Leo Robin, Richard A. Whiting) [2:37]
6. "Lazy Bones" (Hoagy Carmichael, Johnny Mercer) [3:20]

Side B

1. "Lonesome Road" (Nathaniel Shilkret, Gene Austin) [3:23]
2. "The Glory of Love" (Billy Hill) [2:39]
3. "I'm Confessin'" (Doc Daugherty, Al J. Neiburg, Ellis Reynolds) [3:22]
4. "Lover Man" (Jimmy Davis, Roger "Ram" Ramirez, Jimmy Sherman) [3:18]
5. How Deep Is the Ocean?" (Irving Berlin) [2:47]
6. "Do I Worry?" (Stanley Cowan, Bobby Worth) [3:03]
