= Losers, Weepers =

Studio album by Kay Starr
- Released: 1960
- Genre: Pop
- Label: Capitol
- Producer: Dave Cavanaugh

Kay Starr chronology
Movin'! (1959)	Losers, Weepers (1960)	One More Time (1960)

Losers, Weepers is a studio album by Kay Starr. It was released in 1960 by Capitol Records (catalog no. T-1303). It was produced by Dave Cavanaugh. She is backed on the album by Van Alexander and his band. The album's liner notes state: "Kay Starr, working closely and skillfully with the musicians, so that each nuance of lyric, melody, and mood is carried out with full beauty and meaning."

== Reception ==
Professional ratings
Review scores
Source	Rating
AllMusic	4/5 stars

Upon its release, Billboard magazine wrote: "Kay Starr sings the low-down, too-sad-for-tears blues, and the upbeat, rowdy, happy rhythms, and does well by all as evidenced by the selections in her new Capitol album, Losers, Weepers."

AllMusic also gave the album a rating of four stars. Reviewer Scott Yanow wrote that "Starr gives a jazz feeling to each of her dozen interpretations" and concluded his review: "Superior singing."

== Track listing ==
Side A

1. "You Always Hurt the One You Love"
2. "I Should Care"
3. "I'm a Fool to Care" (Ted Daffan)
4. "Don't Take Your Love from Me"
5. "When I Lost You"
6. "Only Forever"

Side B

1. "Gonna Get a Guy" (Howard Simon / Al Lewis)
2. "Please Don't Talk About Me When I'm Gone"
3. "I Miss You So" (Bertha Scott / Jimmy Henderson / Sid Robin)
4. "A Faded Summer Love" (Phil Baxter)
5. "When a Woman Loves a Man" (Bernie Hanighen / Johnny Mercer / Gordon Jenkins)
6. "Into Each Life Some Rain Must Fall"
