= Blue Starr =

Studio album by Kay Starr
- Released: 1957
- Genre: Pop
- Label: RCA Victor

Kay Starr chronology
| The One, The Only Kay Starr (1956) | Blue Starr (1957) | Rockin' with Kay (1958) |

Blue Starr is a studio album by Kay Starr. It was released in 1957 by RCA Victor (catalog no. LPM-1549). It was her second album for RCA Victor. Hal Stanley was the producer.

== Reception ==
Professional ratings
Review scores
| Source | Rating |
|---|---|
| AllMusic | 3/5 stars |

Upon its release, Billboard magazine wrote: "Fans of the thrush from way back will find what they want here -- a pack of somewhat old-timey 'vocal Dixieland.' ... Tunes are all torchers, but tempi are varied."

AllMusic gave the album a rating of three stars. Reviewer William Ruhlmann wrote that the album "had the kind of jazz and blues playing that characterized Starr at her best, and she remained an expressive vocalist whose style was a bit too hot for the more polite supper clubs."

== Track listing ==
Side A

1. "It's A Old Lonesome Town (When You're Not Around)" (Harry Tobias / Charles Kisco)
2. "You're Driving Me Crazy (What Did I Do)"
3. "The House Is Haunted (By the Echo of Your Last Good-Bye)" (Basil Adlam / Billy Rose)
4. "We Three (My Echo, My Shadow and Me)"
5. "I Really Don't Want to Know"

Side B

1. "Blue Starr" (Hal Stanley / Irving Taylor)
2. "Wedding Bells" (Sammy Fain / Irving Kahal / Willie Raskin)
3. "It's Funny to Everyone but Me" (Jack Lawrence)
4. "Little White Lies"
5. "Just Like a Butterfly (That's Caught in the Rain) (Mort Dixon / Harry M. Woods)
6. "Blue and Sentimental" (Count Basie / Jerry Livingston / Mack David)
