= Just Plain Country =

Studio album by Kay Starr
- Released: 1962
- Genre: Pop, country
- Label: Capitol

Kay Starr chronology
I Cry by Night (1962)	Just Plain Country (1962)

Just Plain Country is a studio album by Kay Starr. It was released in 1962 by Capitol Records (catalog no. T-1795). Ken Nelson was the producer. In 2015, the Universal Music Group made the album available on YouTube.

Professional ratings
Review scores
Source	Rating
Billboard	4/4 stars
AllMusic	2/5 stars
New Record Mirror	3/5 stars

Upon its release, Billboard magazine gave the album its highest rating of four stars and wrote: "Kay Starr has always been great at songs of the heart and if there was ever any doubt of that, this collection of strong country material proves it. ... It's warm-hearted wax that fans of the material, not to mention those of the artist, will like."

AllMusic later gave the album a rating of two stars. Reviewer Greg Adams noted that the material tended more toward pop than country.

== Track listing ==
Side A

1. "Pins and Needles in My Heart" (Floyd Jenkins) [2:52]
2. "Crazy" (Willie Nelson) [2:55]
3. "Four Walls" (Marvin J. Moore, George H. Campbell, Jr) [3:10]
4. "My Last Date (With You)" (Floyd Cramer / Boudleaux Bryant / Skeeter Davis) [2:47]
5. "Blues Stay Away from Me" (Alton Delmore) [2:42]
6. "Walk on By" (Kendall Hayes, Gary Walker) [2:14]

Side B

1. "Oh Lonesome Me" (Don Gibson) [2:54]
2. "I Can't Help It (If I'm Still in Love with You)" (Hank Williams) [2:54]
3. "I Really Don't Want to Know" (Don Robertson / Howard Barnes) [4:06]
4. "Singing the Blues" (Melvin Endsley) [2:23]
5. "Don't Worry" (Marty Robbins) [2:43]
