= Duelling pistol =

Type of pistol

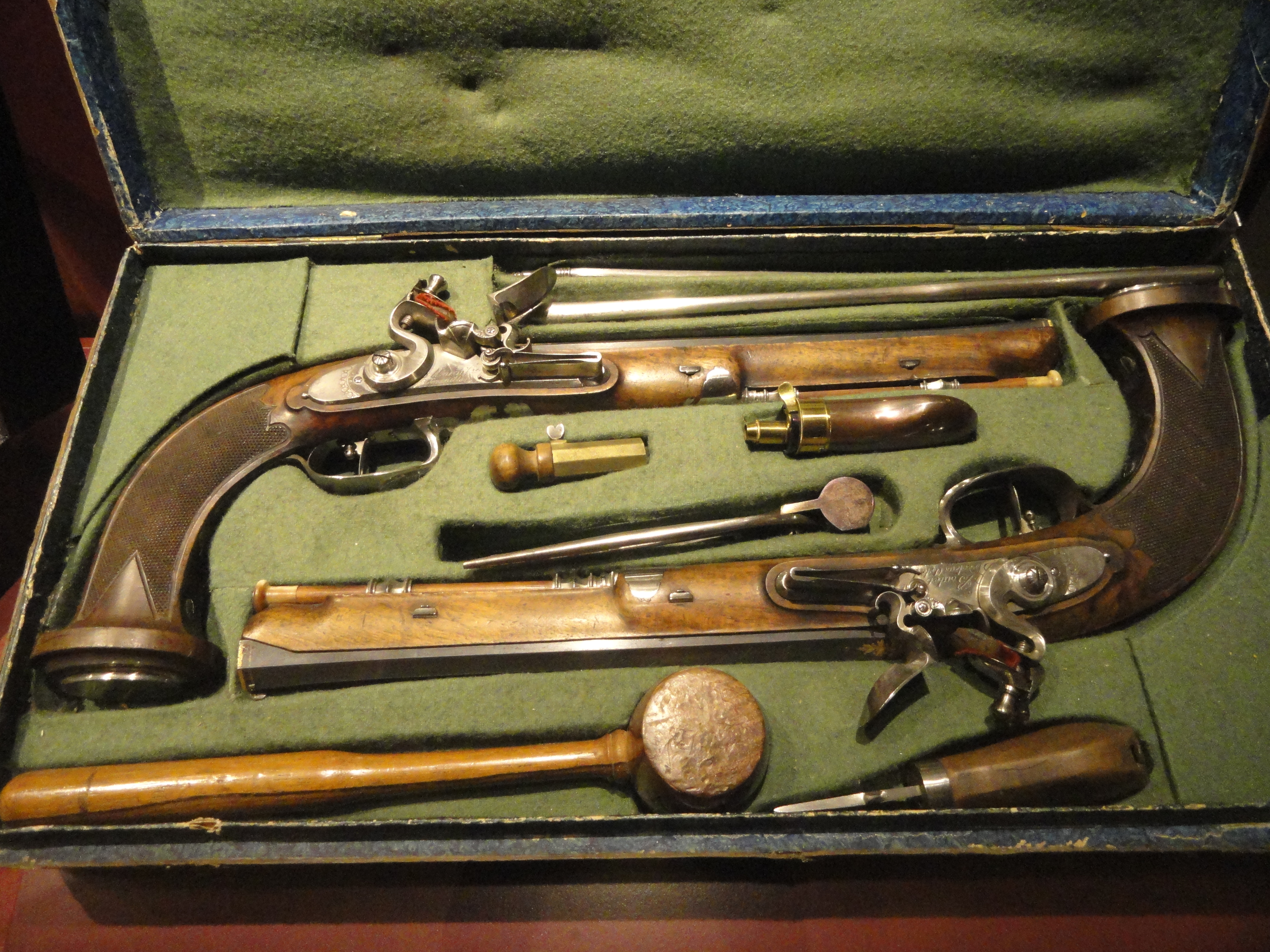
French cased duelling pistols by Nicolas Noël Boutet. Single shot, flintlock, rifled, .58 caliber, blued steel, Versailles, 1794–1797. Royal Ontario Museum, Toronto

A duelling pistol is a type of pistol that was manufactured in matching pairs to be used in a duel, when duels were customary. Duelling pistols are often single-shot flintlock or percussion black-powder pistols which fire a lead ball. Not all fine, antique pairs of pistols are duelling pistols, though they may be called so.

== Design ==
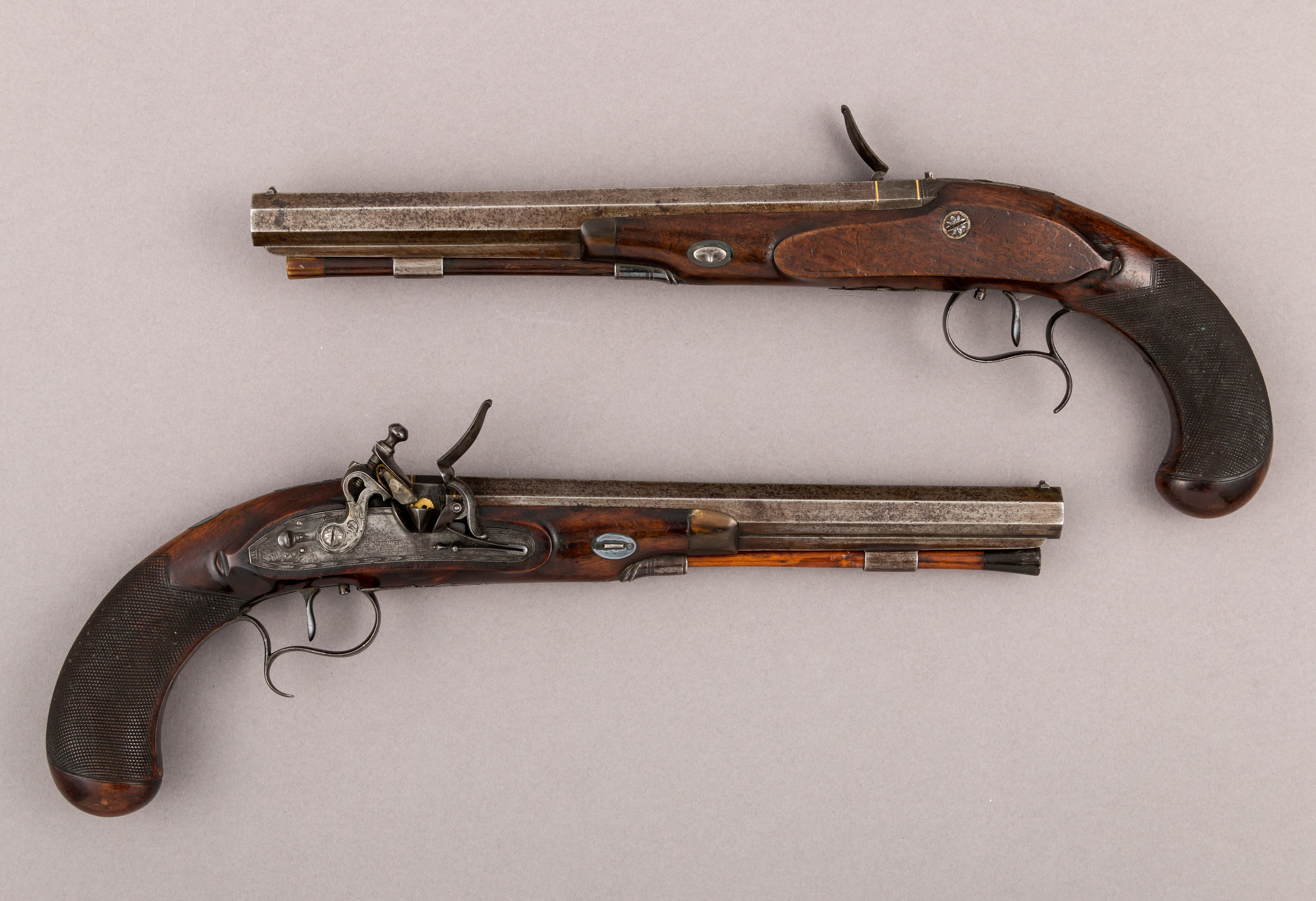
A pair of American flintlock duelling pistols made by Simeon North, ca. 1815–20. Metropolitan Museum of Art, accession Number: 96.5.36, .149 They are fitted with spurs on the trigger guard to improve the shooter's grip. They also have octagonal barrels, often seen on later duelling pistols. The barrels are 10 inches (250 mm) long and are .56-inch (14 mm) calibre

Until the mid-18th century, duels were typically fought with swords. In London, the first recorded pistol duel was in 1711, (Note: This resulted in the death of a Member of Parliament, Sir Cholmeley Dering) but the use of pistols was unusual until the 1760s. Thereafter they quickly took over, and after 1785 it was rare for a sword duel to be fought in London. From about 1770 onwards, gunsmiths were producing pistols expressly made for duelling.

Unless precisely tuned, standard flintlock pistols can have a noticeable delay between pulling the trigger and actually firing the projectile. Purpose-built duelling pistols have various improvements to make them more reliable and accurate.

Duelling pistols have long and heavy barrels—the added weight helps steady aim and reduce recoil. The barrels on earlier guns were cylindrical, while later ones tended to be octagonal. The barrels were given a blued or browned finish to reduce glare. Spurs on the trigger guards began appearing after around 1805 to provide a rest for the middle finger to improve the shooter's grip. Other features were saw handles, platinum-lined touch-holes and hair triggers. Reliability was important because if a duellist's pistol failed to fire, he was considered to have taken his shot and was not permitted to re-cock the pistol and try again.

All component parts were manufactured, hand-finished, and then adjusted with great care and precision, which made duelling pistols much more costly than standard firearms of the period. Special care was taken when moulding the lead bullets to ensure that there were no voids which would affect accuracy. In some duels, the pistols were carefully and identically loaded, and each duellist was offered his choice of the indistinguishable loaded pistols; conversely, sometimes the duellists would use their own pistols and so the weapons would be different.

As duels were generally fought at short distances which were paced out, typically 35 to 45 feet (11 to 14 m), between stationary opponents, extreme accuracy was not required.

Duelling pistols had long barrels – typically around 10 in (250 mm), and fired large, heavy bullets. Pistols with calibers of 0.45 in (11 mm), 0.52 in (13 mm), 0.58 in (15 mm) or even 0.65 in (17 mm) were common. The bullets loaded in them could weigh 214 grains (0.49 ounces; 13.9 grams) in .52 caliber, or more in larger calibers. (Note: Bullets were fired with a muzzle velocity of approximately 253 m/s (830 ft/s), which made a .52 caliber bullet about as lethal as a current .45 ACP round – and therefore capable of inflicting very severe wounds, though speeds of over 385 m/s (1,260 ft/s) (With a kinetic energy of well over 1000 J) and averages between 305–610 m/s (1,001–2,001 ft/s) (With a kinetic energy yield of anywhere between 668–2586 J) were also easily achievable and more common with normal, lower-quality flintlock pistols.) Injuries from such bullets, coupled with the primitive state of emergency medicine at the time when duels were commonplace, meant that pistol duels frequently resulted in fatalities, often some hours or days afterwards. (Note: This was the fate of Alexander Pushkin, a highly experienced pistol duellist who had fought 29 duels before being wounded in the stomach by Georges-Charles de Heeckeren d'Anthès on 8 February 1837. Pushkin managed to return fire, slightly wounding d'Anthès, but died two days later.)

Most English pistols had smooth bores, though some had scratch rifling, a subtle form of rifling which was difficult to see with the naked eye. Pistols with rifled barrels spin-stabilize the shot when it is fired, resulting in much improved accuracy. As a result, duelling pistols with rifled barrels were considered unsporting by many, although there was no unfairness so long as the pistols were identical. The rifling either consisted of a large number of very shallow grooves known as scratch rifling or rifling that stopped short of the end of the pistol known as French rifling. For some in the eighteenth century, duelling with less-accurate, smooth-bore weapons was preferred as they viewed it as allowing the judgement of God to take a role in deciding the outcome of the encounter.

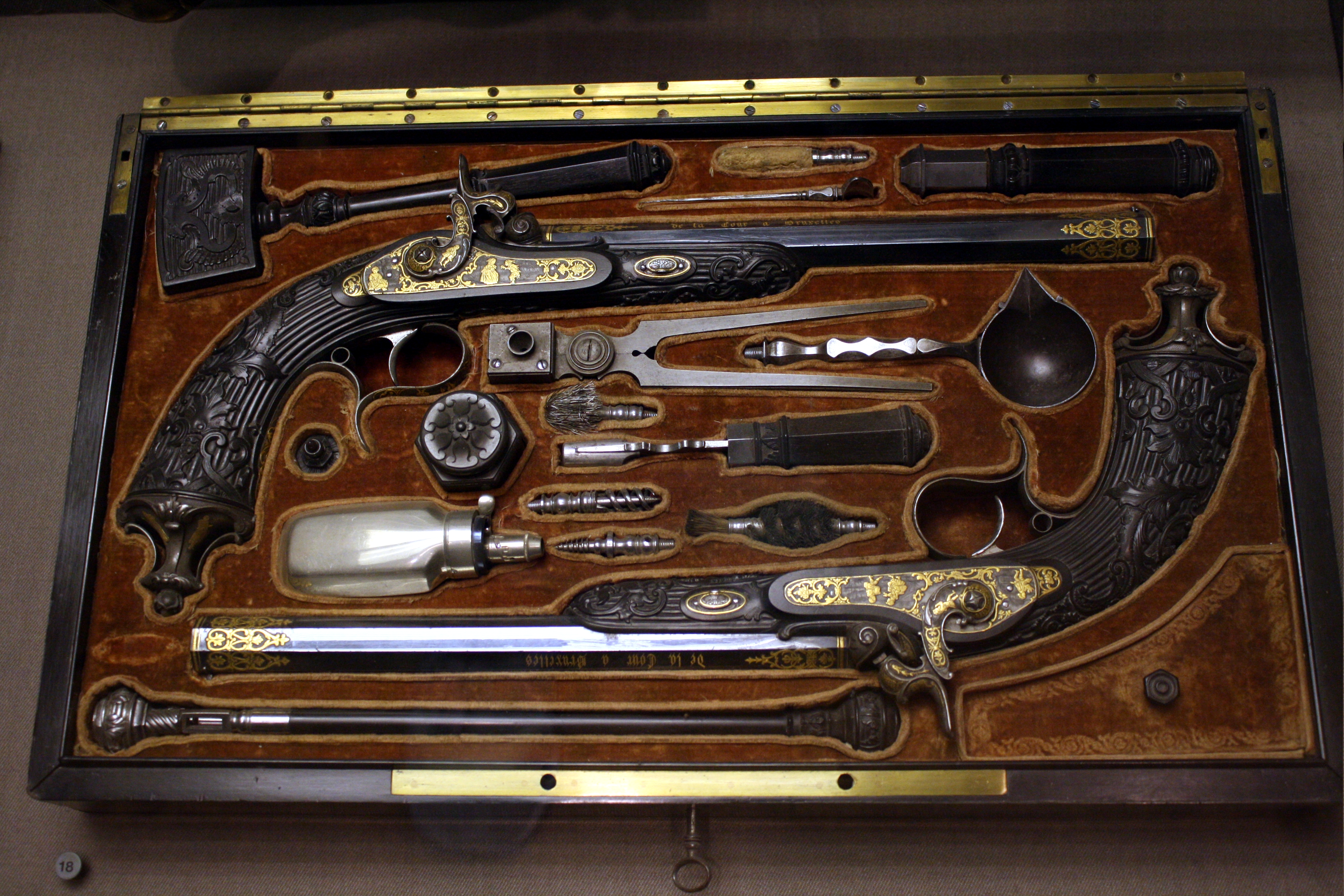
A pair of engraved and gilded French percussion lock duelling pistols in the Philadelphia Museum of Art. The set includes a small casting ladle for pouring molten lead and a bullet mould. And also a mallet for loading the guns

In continental Europe, the use of smooth-bored pistols was considered cowardly, and rifled pistols were the norm. The short range most duels took place at, combined with the accuracy of rifled pistols meant their use substantially increased the chances of a fatality during a duel. A pair of rifled pistols often included a small hammer or mallet as an accessory; they used slightly oversized bullets and a hammer was needed to drive the bullet down the barrel when loading.

Pairs of duelling pistols can be easily confused with holster pistols and travelling pistols. These types are similar to duelling pistols in that they were muzzle-loading weapons that were sometimes expensively made and sold in matched, cased pairs with a set of accessories. Travelling pistols, also known as overcoat pistols, were intended for use by travellers to protect themselves from highwaymen and footpads; unlike duelling pistols, they were commonly rifled. Holster pistols, or horse pistols were used on horseback and carried in pairs in a leather holster slung across a horse's saddle. Although best suited for military use, they were often owned by civilians. Although their purpose was combat or self-defense, holster pistols were used on occasion to fight duels.

== Use ==
It is often stated that duelling pistols came in identical pairs to put each duellist on an equal footing. However, it was acceptable for duels to be fought with different pistols and for each duellist to use their own pair, so they could use weapons they were familiar with. Two pairs of pistols allowed for a second exchange of shots if both missed and the challenger of the duel was intent on continuing. When a duel was fought with a single pair of pistols it was because neither duellist owned their own and the pistols were supplied by a third party. (Note: An account of an 1825 duel in Paris between two Irishmen states that one brought his pair of English Wogdon & Barton pistols, the other had a more-accurate pair of French pistols with rifled barrels and hair-triggers. Despite this disparity, both were intent on using their own weapons. However the seconds of the duel interceded and decided one of the pairs would be used even though one duellist would be disadvantaged by using a pistol he had never fired before. A coin-toss determined the French pair would be used. But the owner of the English pair was unused to his pistol's hair-trigger and accidentally fired before he was ready. He then had to stand still while his opponent spent over a minute taking careful aim; fortunately, he missed.)

There were various forms of pistol duel. In Britain, the favoured type was for the duellists to stand still at an agreed distance and shoot when given the signal, which often involved one of the seconds (standing in the duellists' peripheral vision) holding out his hand to drop a handkerchief. At this point the opponents would raise their pistols and fire at will. Duellists did not directly face their opponent. Instead, they stood side-ways to their opponent in order to present a much smaller target, thereby minimising the risk of being hit. The rules of the "French method" of duelling required the duellists to begin back-to-back, walk a set number of paces before turning and firing.

A further type of duel, known as a barrier duel or a duel à volonté (at pleasure), had the duellists walk towards each other. As the distance closed they could fire at will. But if the first to fire missed, he was required to stand still and wait for his opponent's shot. In 1837, Alexander Pushkin was fatally wounded while fighting this form of duel. The famous fictional duel between Pierre and Dolokhov in the novel War and Peace was also of this kind. For an eye-witness account of such a duel see Reynolds (1839).

== Sport duelling pistols ==
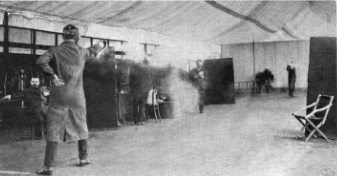
Pistol dueling as an associate event at the 1908 London Olympic Games

During the late 19th and the early 20th centuries, duelling became a sport in which shooters fired at each other using non-lethal rounds. These consisted of wax bullets in a cartridge without any powder charge; the bullet was propelled only by the explosion of the cartridge's primer. Participants wore heavy, protective clothing and a metal helmet, similar to a fencing mask but with an eye-screen of thick glass. Pistol dueling was an associate (non-medal) event at the 1906 and 1908 Olympic games (see Olympic dueling).

The Fauré Le Page company of France made special pistols for sport duelling. These were break action, single-shot weapons that were fitted with a shield in front of the trigger, to protect the hand holding the pistol.

== Manufacturers ==
The use of pistols in duels became popular in the United Kingdom, France, and colonial America during the mid-eighteenth century. Initially standard holster or travelling pistols were mainly used, but by the end of the century special-purpose duelling pistols were being made by craftsmen in England, France, Germany, Austria, and the United States.

The most famous and innovative manufacturers were London-based companies such as Wogdon & Barton, Durs Egg, Manton, Mortimer, Nock, and Purdey. The name Wogden in particular became associated with duelling pistols, to the extent that a duel was sometimes referred to by lawyers as a "Wogden Case".

Pairs of duelling pistols were often supplied in compartmentalised wooden cases along with a powder flask, rods for cleaning and loading, spare flints, spanners and other tools, and a bullet mould.

== Gallery ==
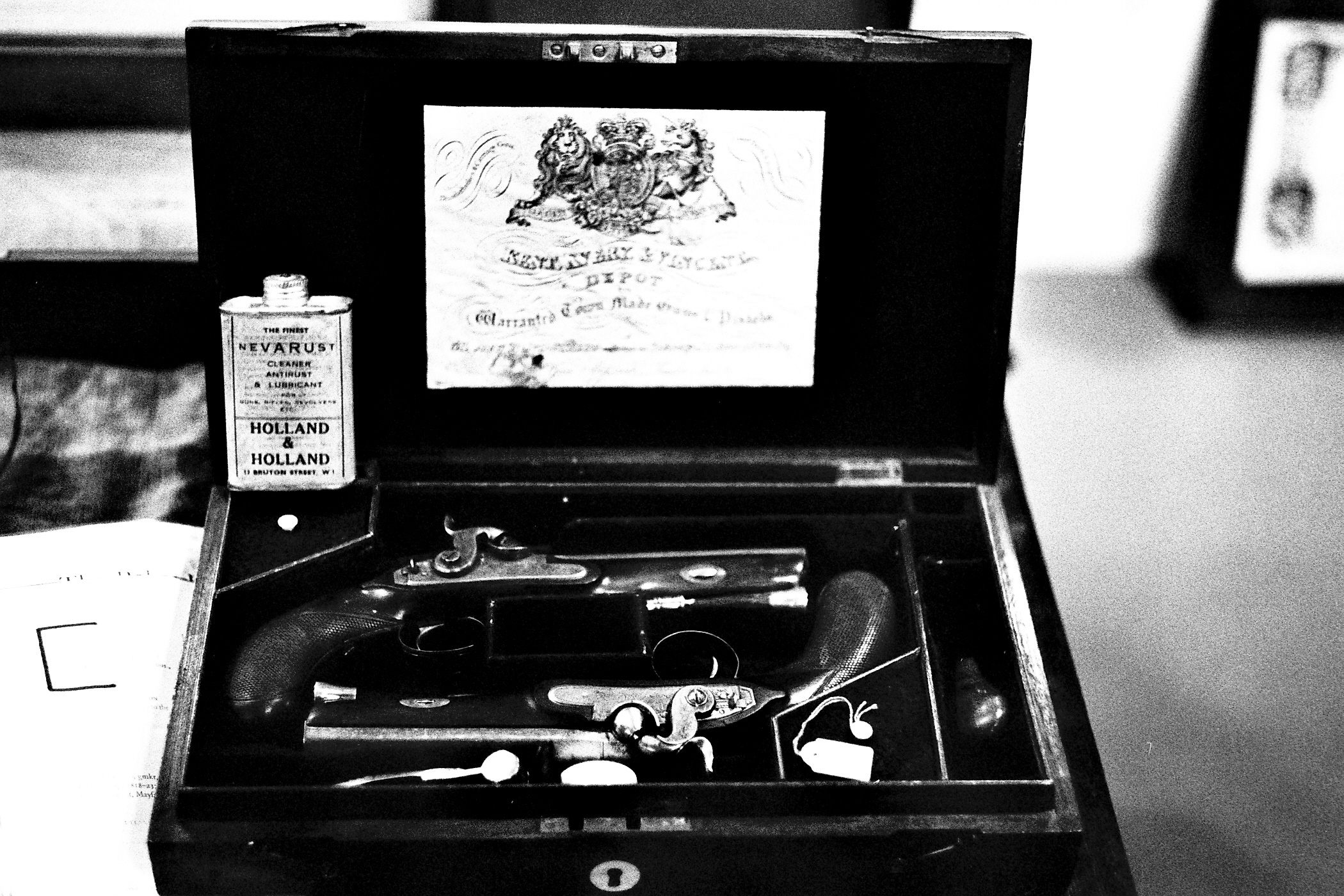
Late model English duelling pistols fired by percussion cap, bearing the Royal Warrant on the case

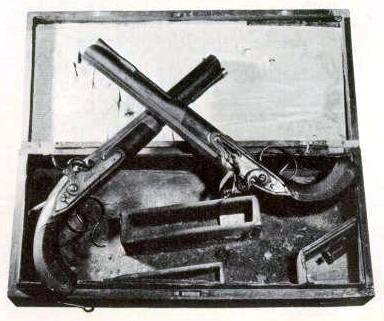
Earlier English flintlock duelling pistols made by Wogdon & Barton, used in the fatal Burr–Hamilton duel of 1804

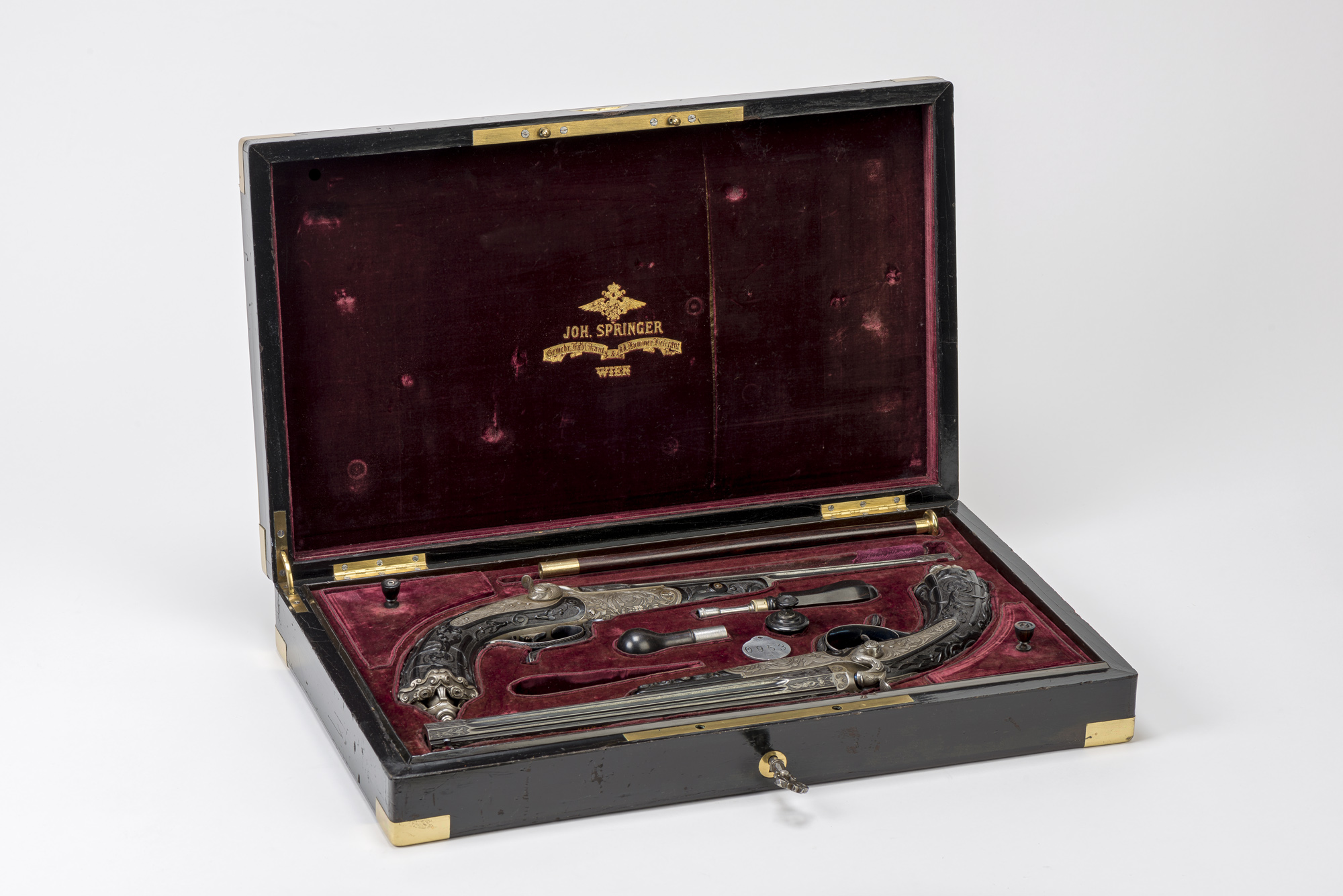
Duelling pistols made by Joh. Springer’s Erben in Vienna. Athens War Museum

== See also ==
- Code duello
- List of people killed in duels
