= Movin'! =

Studio album by Kay Starr
- Released: 1959
- Genre: Pop
- Label: Capitol
- Producer: Dave Cavanaugh

Kay Starr chronology
Rockin' with Kay (1958)	Movin'! (1959)	Losers, Weepers (1960)

Movin'! is a studio album by Kay Starr. It was released in 1959 by Capitol Records (catalog no. T-1254). Produced by Dave Cavanaugh, it was her first album after returning to Capitol. While RCA Victor had her singing material with a pop orientation, the liner notes assert Capitol's intention to "reaffirm her status as a great jazz vocalist." She was backed on the album by an orchestra conducted by Van Alexander and a big band.

Professional ratings
Review scores
Source	Rating
AllMusic	3/5 stars

AllMusic gave the album a rating of three stars. Reviewer Greg Adams wrote that the album "delivers pure big band and traditional pop music with a swingin' beat and Starr's soulful phrasing."

== Track listing ==
Side A

1. "On a Slow Boat to China"
2. "I Cover the Waterfront"
3. "Around the World"
4. "Sentimental Journey"
5. "Night Train"
6. "Riders in the Sky"

Side B

1. "Goin' to Chicago Blues" (Count Basie, Jimmy Rushing)
2. "Indiana"
3. "Song of the Wanderer" (Neil Moret)
4. "Swingin' Down the Lane"
5. "Lazy River"
6. "Movin!'" (Pete Moss, Tom Jürgens)
