= Durs Egg =

Swiss-born British gunmaker

Durrs Egg
- Born: 1745; Basel, Switzerland
- Died: 1831 (aged 85–86); London, England
- Occupation: Firearms designer
- Children: Ann Egg

Durs Egg (1745–1822) was a Swiss-born British gunmaker, noted for his flintlock pistols and for his company's production of the Ferguson rifle.

Egg was apprenticed in Solothurn and Paris before establishing his own business in London in 1772. He was a contemporary of Joseph Manton, Jean Samuel Pauly, and the uncle of Joseph Egg.

== In popular culture ==
A pair of Durs duelling pistols are the subject of the mystery novel The Judas Pair.

Durs Egg is a recurring minor character in the Wrexford and Sloane mystery series by Andrea Penrose.
