= The Reliable Venetian Hand =

The Reliable Venetian Hand was an 18th-century Venetian collector of old master drawings, by Venetian masters and other Italian painters, mostly of the 18th century.

On each drawing he would write an attribution to an artist in beautiful handwriting, possibly employing a professional calligrapher for this. His attributions are mostly highly accurate, which was first noted by Arthur E. Popham in 1935, in his Catalogue of the Fenwick Collection, hence the name given him by grateful scholars of Venetian art.

== See also ==
- List of painters and architects of Venice
