= Lovejoy (TV series) =

British television comedy drama series (1986–1994)

- The main cast from series 1 to 5 (from left): Dudley Sutton, Ian McShane, Chris Jury, and Phyllis Logan
- Genre: Comedy drama, mystery
- Created by: John Grant; Ian La Frenais
- Based on: Lovejoy series by Jonathan Gash
- Starring: Ian McShane; Chris Jury; Phyllis Logan; Dudley Sutton
- Country of origin: United Kingdom
- Original language: English
- No. of series: 6
- No. of episodes: 71 (list of episodes)

Production
- Running time: 50 minutes
- Production companies: BBC; Tamariska Productions; WitzEnd Productions

Original release
- Network: BBC1
- Release: 10 January – 14 March 1986
- Release: 6 January 1991 – 4 December 1994

Lovejoy is a British television comedy-drama mystery series, based on the novels by John Grant under the pen name Jonathan Gash. The show, which ran to 71 episodes over six series, was originally broadcast on BBC1 between 10 January 1986 and 4 December 1994, though there was a five-year gap between the first and second series. It was adapted for television by Ian La Frenais.

== Overview ==
The series concerns the adventures of the eponymous Lovejoy, a roguish antiques dealer based in East Anglia. Within the trade, he has a reputation as a "divvy", a person with almost unnatural powers of recognising exceptional items as well as distinguishing genuine antiques from fakes or forgeries.

== Episodes ==
Series	Episodes	Originally released	
Series	Episodes	First released	Last released
1	10	10 January 1986	14 March 1986
2	11	6 January 1991	24 March 1991
3	13	12 January 1992	26 December 1992
4	13	10 January 1993	11 April 1993
5	14	5 September 1993	27 December 1993
6	10	2 October 1994	4 December 1994

== Characters ==
- Lovejoy, played by Ian McShane, a less than scrupulous, yet likeable antique dealer
- Eric Catchpole, played by Chris Jury (series 1–5; guest, series 6), Lovejoy's younger, enthusiastic, but ever so slightly dim, assistant
- Tinker Dill, played by Dudley Sutton, "barker" and tout who is friends with Lovejoy
- Lady Jane Felsham, played by Phyllis Logan (series 1–5; guest, series 6), has a friendly, flirtatious relationship with Lovejoy, often helping him with his deals
- Charlie Gimbert, played by Malcolm Tierney (series 1, 4–5), Lovejoy's landlord and the owner of a local auction house, he is also Lovejoy's nemesis and rival within the antiques trade
- Beth Taylor, played by Diane Parish (series 5–6), Lovejoy's new apprentice following the departure of Eric Catchpole
- Charlotte Cavendish, played by Caroline Langrishe (series 5–6), an auctioneer who becomes Lovejoy's love interest

== Locations ==
The series was mostly set and filmed in Suffolk and Essex. Much was filmed around Long Melford. Belchamp Hall in Essex was used as 'Felsham Hall'. The beach where the character Drummer had his shack was Shingle Street in Suffolk. The harbour and Coast Guard station were at Walberswick, Suffolk. The unveiling ceremony that Lady Jane is first seen at was filmed in Kersey, Suffolk. The sea fort used was the Horse Sand Fort much further south in the Solent.

== Broadcast history ==
The series was notable for its style and pace. Lovejoy would frequently break the fourth wall, revealing his thoughts and motives by addressing the audience directly. The first series was shown on BBC1 in the first half of 1986. It concluded with a two-part special.

Despite the first series being a moderate ratings success, Lovejoy was not brought back until January 1991. The delay was partly due to a financing disagreement between executive producer and BBC management which resolved in 1989 after personnel turnover. The original four cast members returned for the next two series between 1991 and 1992. With the start of the fourth series in 1993, Malcolm Tierney reprised his first series role as Charlie Gimbert.

During the fifth series, several cast changes were made. Phyllis Logan left the show in the second episode and Chris Jury departed in the sixth episode, although both characters returned for the sixth series finale. Two new regular characters were added: Lovejoy's new apprentice, Beth Taylor, and Charlotte Cavendish, who ran a local antiques auction house.

The sixth and final series of ten episodes was broadcast between October and December 1994. Two ninety-minute Lovejoy specials for Christmas were shown in 1992 and 1993. The theme tune used in the opening and end credits, as well as the incidental music for each episode, was composed by Denis King.

== Releases ==
In the United States, the series was first broadcast on the A&E Network. It was marketed as The Lovejoy Mysteries on VHS in the United States. The DVD release of the entire series has returned to the title of Lovejoy.
