= Lovejoy (novel series) =

Series of novels by Jonathan Gash

- Author: Jonathan Gash
- Country: United Kingdom
- Language: English
- Genre: Picaresque
- Published: 1977–2008
- Media type: Print
- No. of books: 24

Lovejoy is a series of picaresque novels by John Grant (under the pen name Jonathan Gash) about the adventures of Lovejoy, a British antiques dealer and faker based in East Anglia. A less than scrupulous yet likeable rogue, Lovejoy has a reputation in the antiques trade as a "divvie", meaning one with an almost supernatural talent for recognising exceptional items as well as for distinguishing fakes or forgeries from genuine antiques. Lovejoy's first name is never mentioned in the books. In the TV series based on the novels, he insists on being addressed by all solely as "Lovejoy".

== Television adaptation ==
Lovejoy, a television adaptation of the books starring Ian McShane, aired from 1986 to 1994 for a total of 73 episodes. The first series, aired in 1986, adapted many plots and characters from the books, while new material created for the TV show was added from the second series onwards.

== Series ==
- The Judas Pair (1977)
- Gold from Gemini (1978), U.S. edition: Gold by Gemini (1979)
- The Grail Tree (1979)
- Spend Game (1981)
- The Vatican Rip (1981)
- Firefly Gadroon (1982)
- The Sleepers of Erin (1984)
- The Gondola Scam (1984)
- Pearlhanger (1985)
- The Tartan Ringers (1986), U.S. edition: The Tartan Sell (1986)
- Moonspender (1988)
- Jade Woman (1988)
- The Very Last Gambado (1989)
- The Great California Game (1991)
- The Lies of Fair Ladies (1992)
- Paid and Loving Eyes (1993)
- The Sin within Her Smile (1993)
- The Grace in Older Women (1995)
- The Possessions of a Lady (1996)
- The Rich and the Profane (1998)
- A Rag, a Bone and a Hank of Hair (1999)
- Every Last Cent (2000)
- Ten Word Game (2003)
- Faces in the Pool (2008)
