= I Hear the Word =

Studio album by Kay Starr
- Released: 1959
- Genre: Spiritual
- Label: RCA Victor

I Hear the Word is a studio album of inspirational songs by Kay Starr. It was released in 1959 by RCA Victor (catalog no. LSP-2055). Starr was backed up on the album by The Jimmy Joyce Singers and an orchestra conducted by Bill Stafford.

== Reception ==
Professional ratings
Review scores
Source	Rating
Billboard	4/4 stars
AllMusic	3/5 stars

Upon its release, Billboard magazine gave the album its highest rating of four stars and wrote: "The great thrush comes thru in satisfying style on this fine grouping of spirituals and inspirational material. ... The gal's lusty, soulful piping seems especially well adapted to this kind of repertoire."

AllMusic later gave the album a rating of three stars. Reviewer Greg Adams wrote that "this fun and swinging collection is much less stately than the stiff and overly intellectual folk and spiritual albums that were often made in the '50s."

== Track listing ==
Side A

1. "Oh, What a Wonderful Feeling" [2:53]
2. "Sometimes I Feel Like a Motherless Child" [3:47]
3. "Jezebel" [3:09]
4. "Down by the Riverside" [2:23]
5. "I Shall Not Be Moved" [2:49]
6. "Rock-a-My Soul" [2:30]

Side B

1. "Tell Me How Long The Train's Been Gone" [3:14]
2. "Go Down Moses" [3:27]
3. "Shadrack" [2:46]
4. "Get on Board" [2:24]
5. "Grace" [2:58]
6. "Joshua" [2:30]
