= In a Blue Mood =

Studio album by Kay Starr
- Released: 1955
- Genre: Pop
- Label: Capitol

Kay Starr chronology
In a Blue Mood (1955)	The One, The Only Kay Starr (1956)

Professional ratings
Review scores
Source	Rating
AllMusic	2/5 stars

In a Blue Mood is a studio album by Kay Starr. It was released in 1955 by Capitol Records (catalog no. T-580).

Upon its release, Billboard magazine wrote that the 12 songs selected for the album show Starr "at her bluesy best" with songs allowing her to display "atmosphere and mood". AllMusic gave the album a rating of two stars.

== Track listing ==
Side A

1. "After You've Gone"
2. "A Woman Likes to Be Told" (Hoagy Carmichael / Harold Adamson)
3. "Maybe You'll Be There"
4. "I'm Waiting for Ships That Never Come In" (Abe Olman / Jack Yellen)
5. "What Will I Tell My Heart" (Peter Tinturin / Jack Lawrence)
6. "Evenin'" (Aaron "T-Bone" Walker)

Side B

1. "He's Funny That Way"
2. "I Got the Spring Fever Blues" (Dave Bauer / Kay Werner / Sue Werner)
3. "Don't Tell Him What Happened to Me" (Buddy DeSylva / Lew Brown / Ray Henderson)
4. "I Got It Bad, and That Ain't Good"
5. "Everybody's Somebody's Fool" (Ace Adams / Lionel Hampton)
6. "It Will Have to Do Until the Real Thing Comes Along"
