= Kay Starr =

American singer (1922–2016)

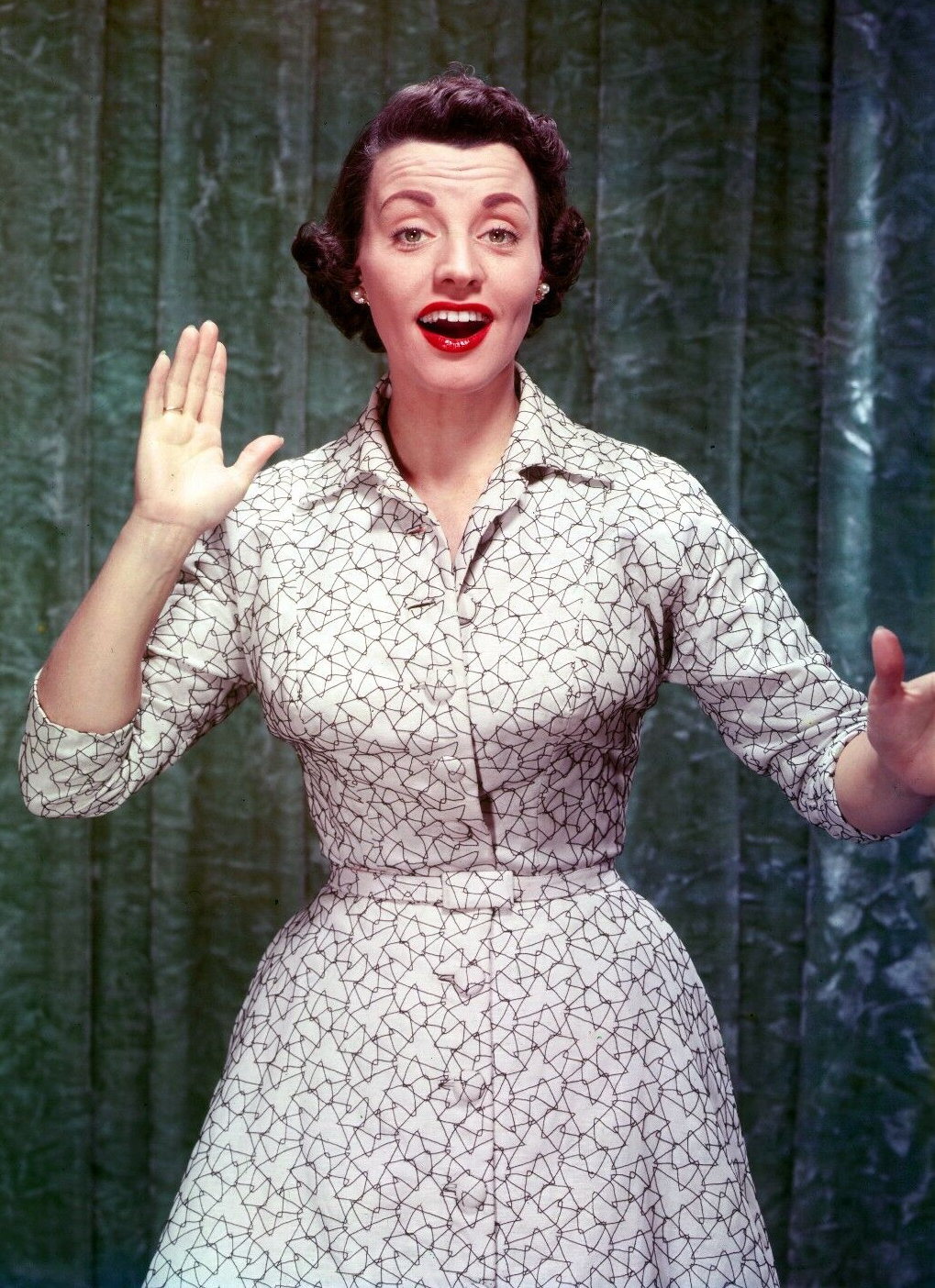
- Publicity photo, c. 1950s

Background information
- Born: Catherine Laverne Starks; July 21, 1922; Dougherty, Oklahoma, U.S.
- Died: November 3, 2016 (aged 94) Los Angeles, California, U.S.
- Genres: Traditional pop; jazz; country; western swing
- Occupation: Singer
- Labels: Capitol; RCA Victor; Happy Tiger; His Master's Voice

Kay Starr (born Catherine Laverne Starks; July 21, 1922 – November 3, 2016) was an American singer who enjoyed considerable success in the late 1940s and 1950s. She was of Iroquois and Irish heritage. Starr performed multiple genres, such as pop, jazz, and country, but her roots were in jazz. Her 1952 song "Wheel of Fortune" was a smash hit, and later inducted into the Grammy Hall of Fame. Additionally, she had big hits with "Allez-Vous-En" (from the Broadway show CAN-CAN) and "If You Love Me (Really Love Me)" in 1953 and 1954, respectively.

== Early life ==
Catherine Laverne Starks was born in Dougherty, Oklahoma, to Annie and Harry Starks. Her mother's ancestors were Irish-American, while her father was a Native American Iroquois. She later claimed to be both Cherokee and Choctaw descent. When she was three years old, the Starks family moved to Dallas, Texas, where her father obtained a job installing building sprinklers. Her mother raised chickens to support the family as well. Catherine began singing during early childhood, often performing to the chickens that her mother was raising. She sang frequently around the house, which caught the attention of her aunt, with whose help she took part in a local talent contest and won at the age of seven.

== Career ==
Young Catherine continued to enter talent contests, and eventually landed a spot performing on Dallas's WRR radio station. She performed twice a week and earned three dollars a performance. The Starks family moved to Memphis, Tennessee, when she was 15 and was given her own "Starr Segment" on Memphis's WREC station. Due to many people incorrectly saying her last name, she adapted the stage name of "Kay Starr". During high school, she worked with various country music bands. She was discovered by jazz violinist Joe Venuti, who had obtained a contract to perform at the Peabody Hotel in the summer of 1937. Starr's parents accepted the performance opportunity, as long as she was home by their midnight curfew. Venuti did not tell the hotel her real age, and fibbed about Starr's mother being her sister. For the next two summers, Starr performed alongside Venuti.

Starr's singing attracted the attention of Bob Crosby's manager and had her join Crosby on the road. She went to New York City and played with Crosby's band for two weeks until she was dismissed by the show's sponsor for being considered "too earthy". Despite being let go, she caught the attention of Glenn Miller, who needed a substitute female performer while his regular performer (Marion Hutton) was ill. For two weeks, Starr performed at the Glen Island Casino alongside Miller's orchestra. At age 16, Starr recorded her first tracks with Miller's orchestra: "Baby Me" and "Love with a Capital 'You'". The songs failed to become a success. This was in part because the band played in a key that, while appropriate for Hutton, did not suit Kay. Starr later recalled that she sounded like "a jazzed up Alfalfa" since they were not in her range.

Starr and her mother then returned to Memphis, where she completed high school in 1940. She then moved to Los Angeles and worked alongside Venuti until 1941.

Starr then signed with Wingy Manone's band. From 1943 to 1945 she sang with Charlie Barnet's ensemble, retiring for a year after contracting pneumonia and later developing nodes on her vocal cords as a result of fatigue and overwork. In 1946 Starr became a soloist and a year later signed a contract with Capitol Records. The label had a number of female singers signed up, including Peggy Lee, Ella Mae Morse, Jo Stafford, and Margaret Whiting, so it was hard to find her a niche of her own. In 1948 when the American Federation of Musicians was threatening a strike, Capitol wanted to have each of its singers record a back list for future release. Being junior to all these other artists meant that every song Starr wanted to sing was taken by her rivals on the label, leaving her a list of old songs which nobody else wanted to record.

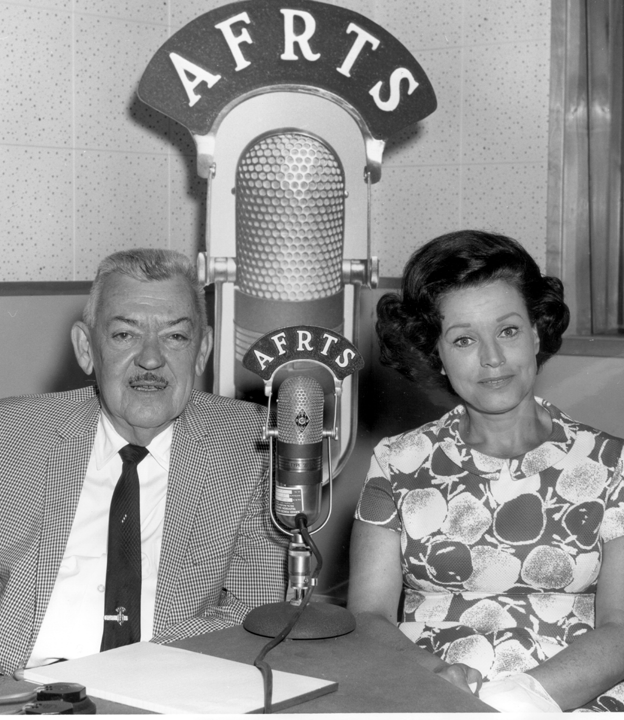
Kay Starr with Andy Mansfield on AFRTS' America's Popular Music (1968)

In 1950, she returned home to Dougherty and heard a fiddle recording of "Bonaparte's Retreat" by Pee Wee King. She liked it so much that she wanted to record it. She contacted Roy Acuff's publishing house in Nashville and spoke to Acuff directly. He was happy to let her record it, but it took a while for her to make clear that she was a singer, not a fiddler, and therefore needed to have some lyrics written. Acuff came up with a new lyric, and "Bonaparte's Retreat" became her biggest hit up to that point, with close to a million sales.

In 1955, she signed with RCA Victor Records. However, at this time, rock-and-roll was displacing the existing forms of pop music and Kay had only two hits, the aforementioned, which is sometimes considered her attempt to sing rock and roll, and sometimes as a song poking fun at it, "The Rock and Roll Waltz". She stayed at RCA Victor until 1959, hitting the top ten with "My Heart Reminds Me", then returned to Capitol.

Most of Starr's songs had jazz influences. Like those of Frankie Laine and Johnnie Ray, they were sung in a style that anticipated rock and roll songs. These included her hits "Wheel of Fortune" (her biggest hit, No. 1 for 10 weeks), "Side by Side", "The Man Upstairs", and "Rock and Roll Waltz". One of her biggest hits was her version of "(Everybody's Waitin' For) The Man with the Bag", a Christmas song that became a holiday favorite.

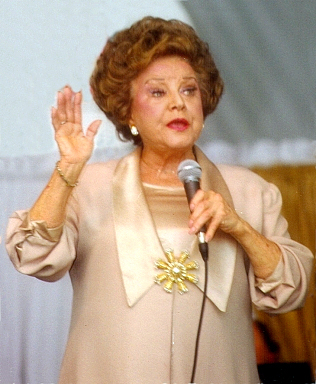
Kay Starr in 2009

After rock-and-roll swept established performers from the charts, Starr appeared in the television series Club Oasis, mostly associated with the bandleader Spike Jones. She recorded several albums, including Movin' (1959), Losers, Weepers... (1960), I Cry By Night (1962), and Just Plain Country (1962).

After leaving Capitol for a second time in 1966, Starr continued touring in the US and the UK. She recorded several jazz and country albums on small independent labels, including How About This, a 1968 album with Count Basie.

In the late 1980s, she performed in the revue 3 Girls with Helen O'Connell and Margaret Whiting, and in 1993 she toured the United Kingdom as part of Pat Boone's April Love Tour. Her first live album, Live at Freddy's, was released in 1997. She sang with Tony Bennett on his album Playin' with My Friends: Bennett Sings the Blues (2001).

== Death ==
Starr died from complications of Alzheimer's disease in Los Angeles, on November 3, 2016, at the age of 94. Starr was married six times, including, briefly in 1953, to bandleader/composer Vic Schoen. Starr was survived by a daughter.

== Discography ==
Studio albums

- The Kay Starr Style (1955)
- In a Blue Mood (1956)
- The One, The Only Kay Starr (1956)
- Blue Starr (1957)
- Rockin' with Kay (1957)
- I Hear the Word (1959)
- Movin'! (1959)
- Losers, Weepers (1960)
- Movin' on Broadway! (1960)
- Kay Starr: Jazz Singer (1960)
- Just Plain Country (1962)
- I Cry by Night (1962)
- Tears and Heartaches/Old Records (1966)
- When the Lights Go on Again (1968)
- How About This (with Count Basie) (1969)
- Kay Starr Country (1974)
- Back to the Roots (1975)
- Kay Starr (1981)
