= Sounds of Vancouver 2010 =

Sounds of Vancouver 2010 can refer to one of three albums made for the 2010 Winter Olympics in Vancouver:

- Sounds of Vancouver 2010: Opening Ceremony Commemorative Album, from the opening ceremony
- Sounds of Vancouver 2010: Closing Ceremony Commemorative Album, from the closing ceremony
- Canada's Hockey Anthems: Sounds of the Vancouver 2010 Olympic Winter Games
