= Toccata for Percussion Instruments (Chávez) =

- by Carlos Chávez
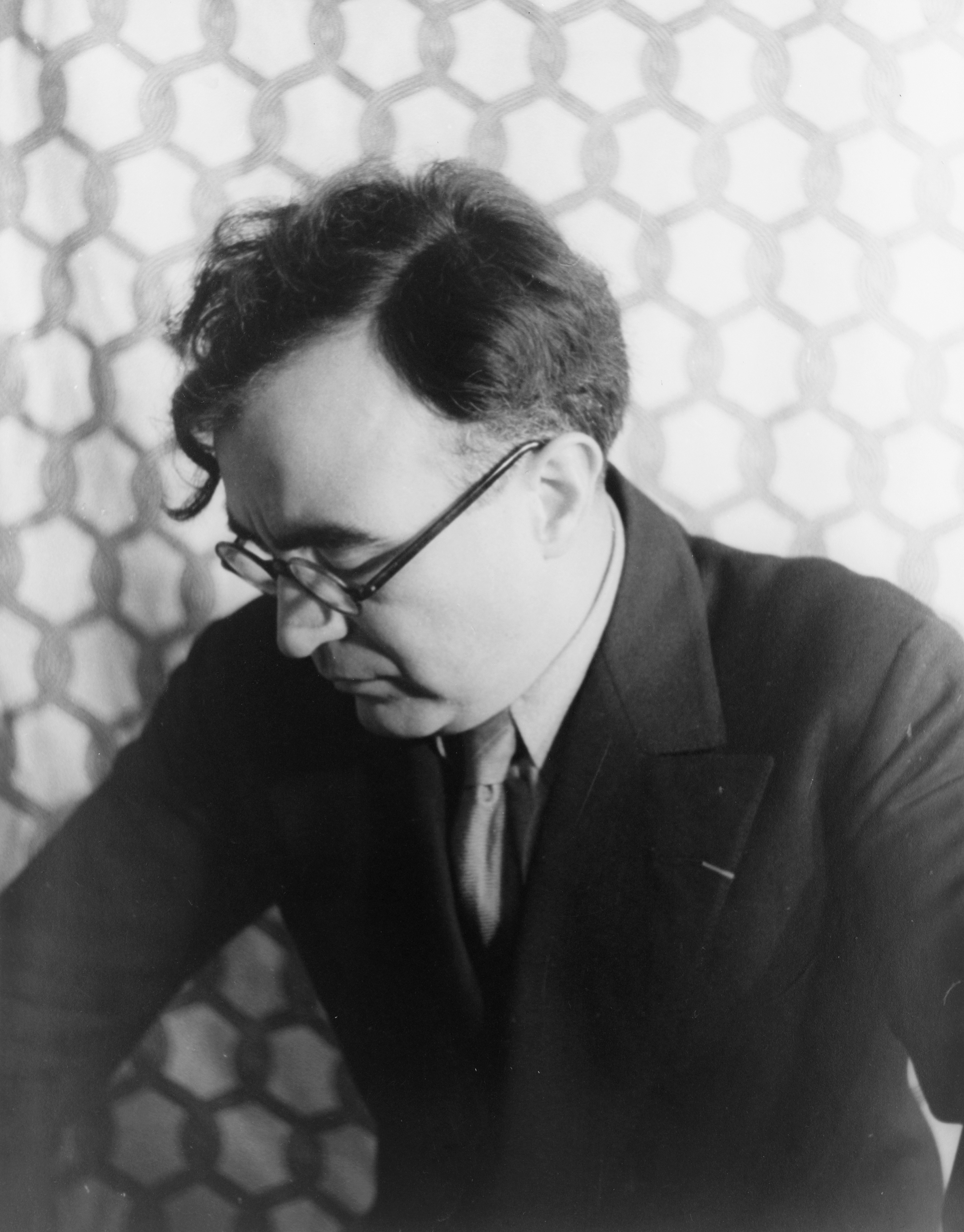
- Portrait of Carlos Chávez by Carl van Vechten (1937)
- Composed: 1942
- Movements: 3

Premiere
- Date: October 31, 1947
- Conductor: Eduardo Hernández Moncada
- Performers: Members of the orchestra of the Conservatorio Nacional de Música

The Toccata for Percussion Instruments (1942), was written by the twentieth-century Mexican composer Carlos Chávez. It is among his most popular compositions. The composition is written for six musicians playing a number of percussion instruments.

== Background ==
Chávez was approached in the 1930s by the avant-garde composer John Cage, who asked whether Chávez could compose a piece for the percussion ensemble that was touring with Cage. The 12-minute piece was completed in 1942, in time for Cage's West Coast tour. However, the ensemble was unable to perform the piece, due to the challenging sustained drum rolls in the opening measures. The Toccata was eventually premiered in 1948 by the Orquesta Sinfónica de México, the orchestra which Chávez founded and conducted. Eduardo Hernández Moncada, however, had already conducted a premiere on October 31, 1947, with members of the orchestra of the National Conservatory.

In 1952 Xavier Francis choreographed the Toccata for the Academia de la Danza Mexicana, under the title Tóxcatl. Scenery and costumes were by Miguel Covarrubias, and the principal dancers were Xavier Francis, Raquel Gutiérrez, and Elena Noriega. The title refers to one of the eighteen fixed festivals of the Aztec calendar, celebrated in the fifth month of each year in honor of Tezcatlipoca (the "smoking mirror" or "mirror of fire").

== Structure ==
The Toccata is composed for 2 snare drums, Indian drums (1 small and 1 or 2 larger ones), 2 tenor drums, bass drum, claves, maraca, 2 suspended cymbals, large and small gongs, 2 tubular chimes, glockenspiel, xylophone, and 3 timpani, distributed among six players. It is in three movements, played without a break.

The Toccata was one of the first major pieces written for percussion ensemble alone, becoming a cornerstone in rhythmic music. Originally, a toccata was a fast, virtuosic composition. However, Chávez applied the word "toccata" in its original sense, using its root meaning of toccare, or "to touch", which he used to display the various touches an artist can give a performance, rather the different lyrical shades. For the U.S. premiere, during which the composer himself conducted the Los Angeles Philharmonic, Chávez wrote in the program notes that "The Toccata was written as an experiment in orthodox percussion instruments – those used regularly in symphony orchestras, that is, avoiding the exotic and the picturesque. Therefore it relies on its purely musical expression and formalistic structure."

The first and last movements of the three-movement work are both in sonata form, during which the composer explores long, sustained rolls, and syncopated patterns. There is a passage in which the players are instructed to muffle the drums by covering the heads with a cloth or chamois. The slow middle movement emphasizes the timbres and tones of the metallic, normally atonal percussion instruments. During the movement, the glockenspiel and xylophone also play fragmented melodious strands, bringing out the composer's Mexican roots. This offers a moment of relaxed interlude before the violent final movement.

The piece has been described as rhythmically ebullient, and as a brilliant study of rhythm and color, "creating an original climate of intense attractiveness and achieving great diversity of accents, sounds, and nuances."

== Cultural references ==
- Toccata for Percussion Instruments was used as music accompaniment for the experimental film See Saw Seams (1965) by Stan Vanderbeek.
- In 1983, Jiří Kylián choreographed a ballet, Stamping Ground, to Chávez's Toccata.
