= Christodoulopoulos =

Christodoulopoulos (Greek: Χριστοδουλόπουλος) is a Greek surname with the female form being Christodoulopoulou (Χριστοδουλοπούλου). It is the surname of:

- Ariana Chris (born 1975 as Ariadni Christodoulopoulou), Greek-Canadian mezzo-soprano.
- Giannis Christodoulopoulos (born 1983), Greek composer.
- Ioannis Christodoulopoulos (1779–1853), Greek revolutionary.
- Lazaros Christodoulopoulos (born 1986), Greece national team footballer.
- Makis Christodoulopoulos (born 1948), Greek singer.
- Tasia Christodoulopoulou, Greek politician and government minister.
