= Percussion ensemble =

Musical ensemble consisting of only percussion instruments

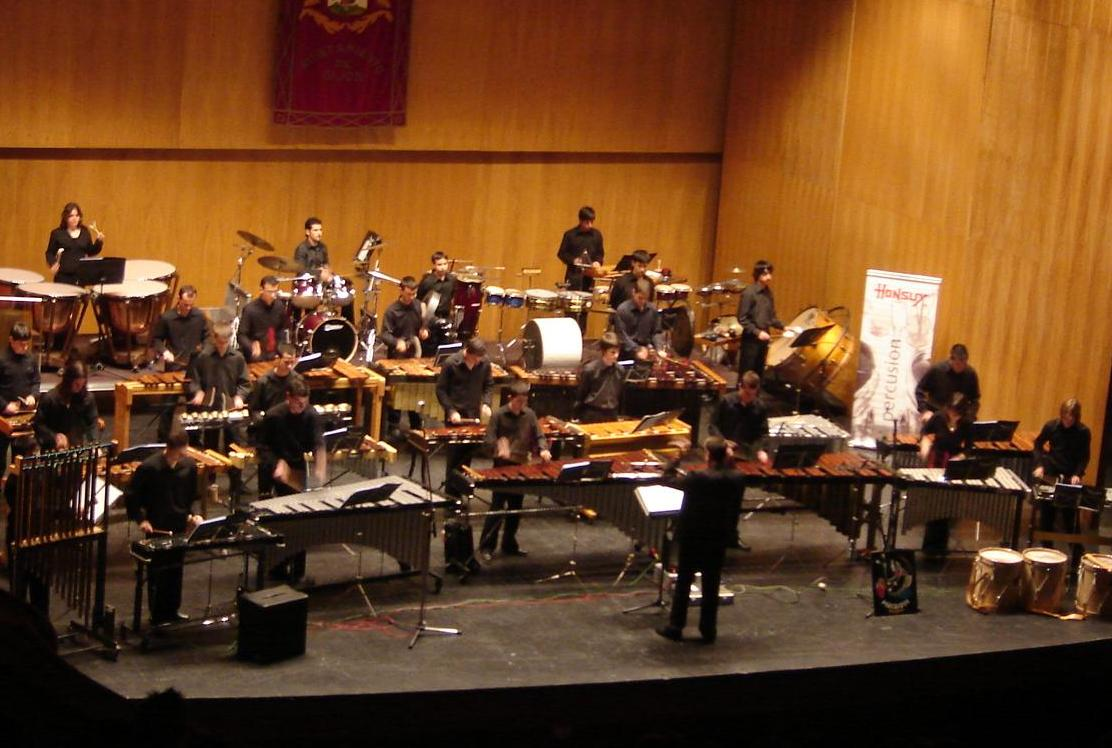
Percussion orchestra Percujove in concert

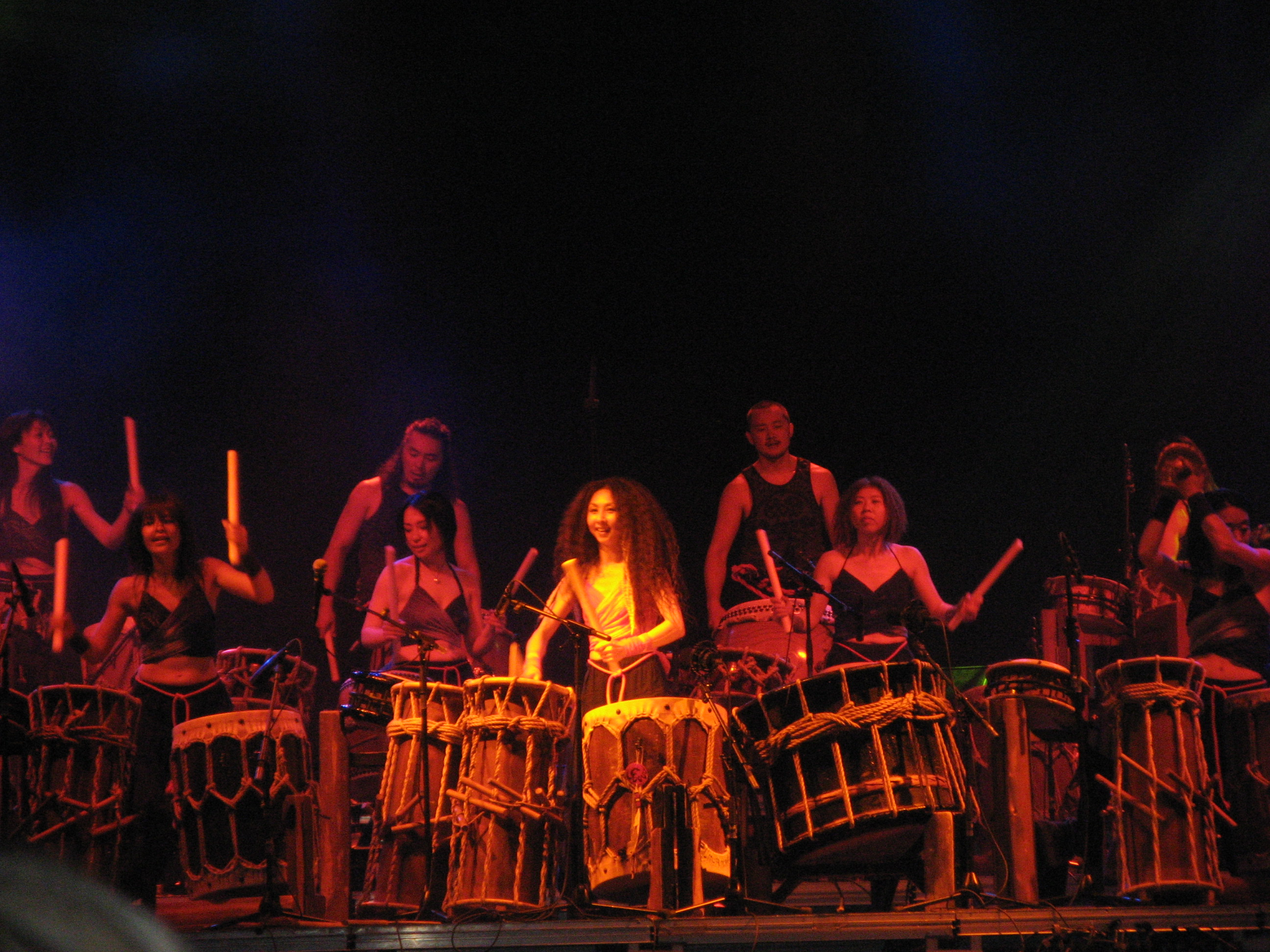
Gocoo in concert

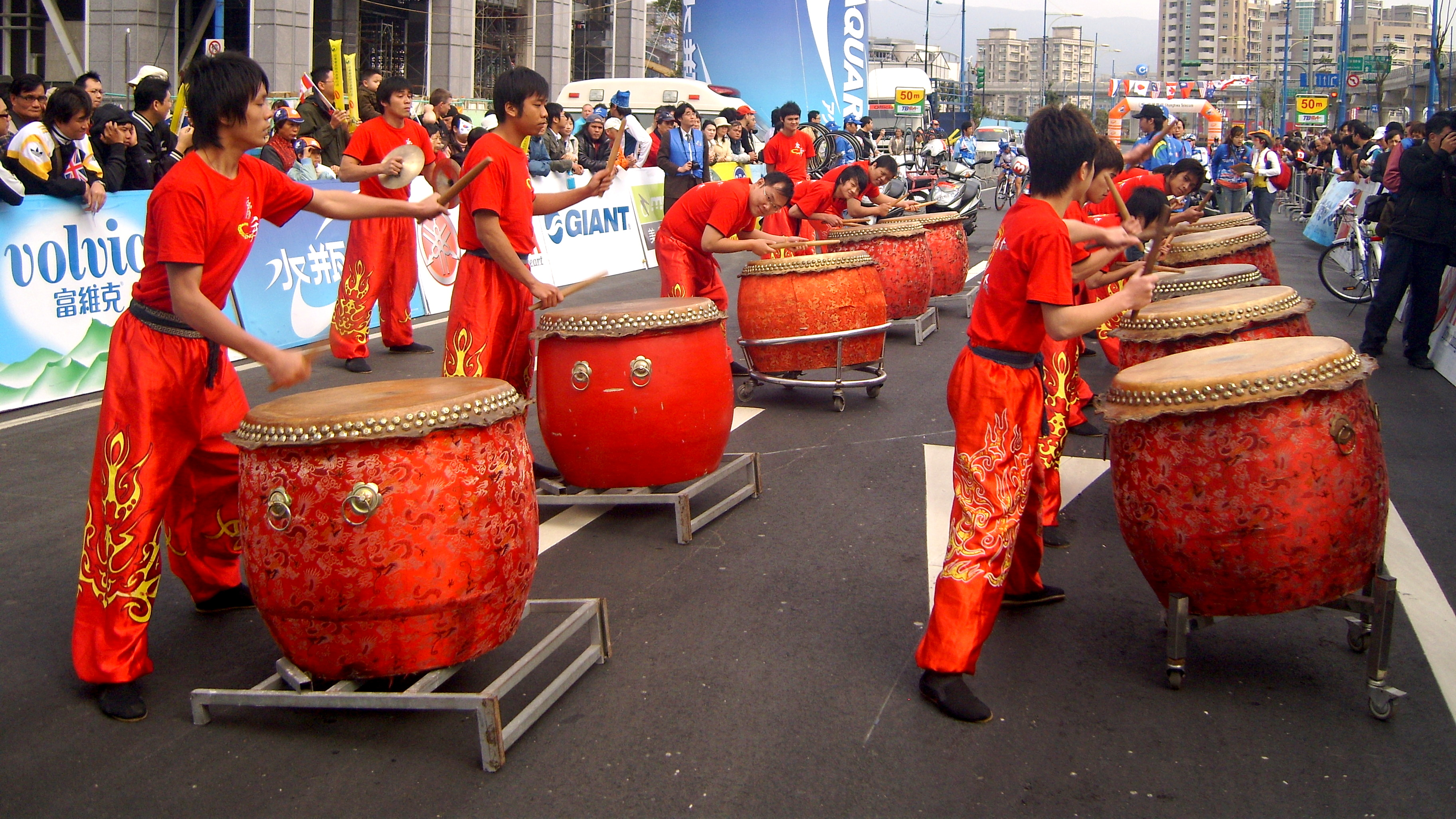
Taiwanese drum ensemble

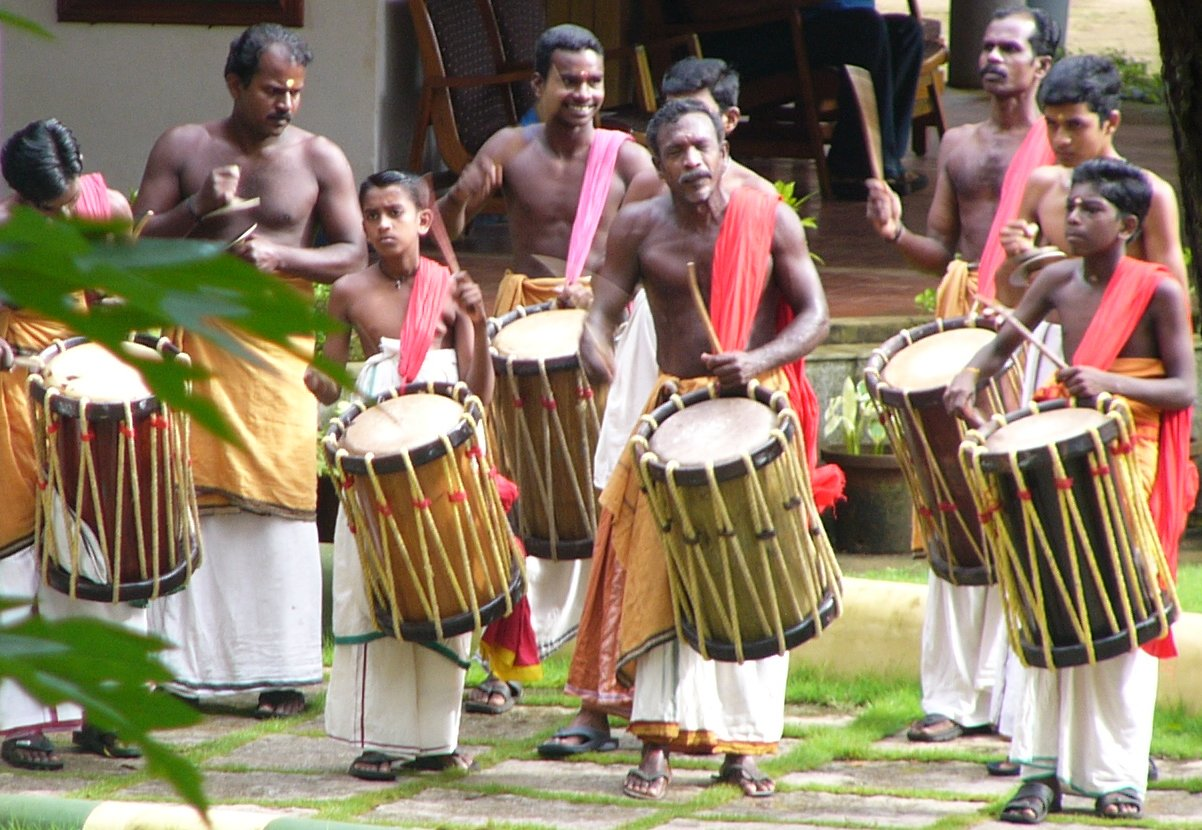
A Thayambaka Chenda ensemble

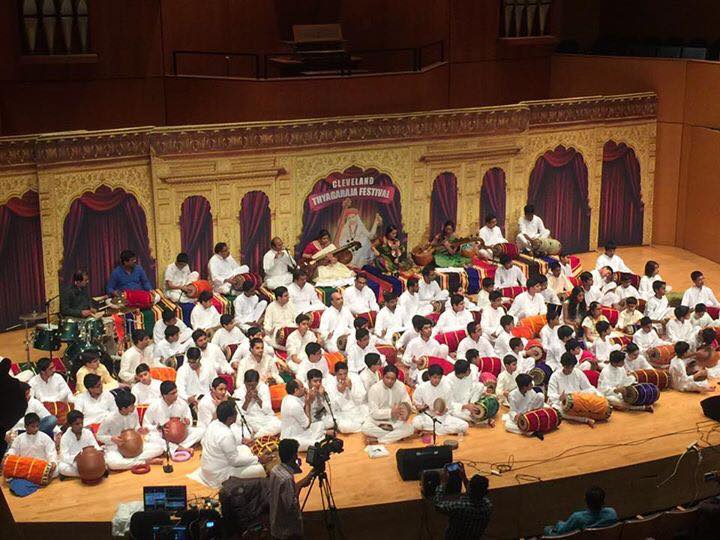
A Carnatic ensemble playing in Cleveland

A percussion ensemble is a musical ensemble consisting of only percussion instruments. Although the term can be used to describe any such group, it commonly refers to groups of classically trained percussionists performing primarily classical music. In America, percussion ensembles are most commonly found at conservatories, though some professional groups, such as Nexus and So Percussion exist. Drumlines and groups who regularly meet for drum circles are two other forms of the percussion ensemble.

== Early literature ==
George Antheil's Ballet Mécanique (1925) is one of the earliest examples of composition for percussion, written originally as a film score and exemplifying the ideals of the Italian futurist movement. Antheil originally called for sixteen synchronized player pianos, as well as airplane engines, alongside more traditional percussion instruments. Early performances of the work for one self-playing piano were held in Paris in 1925 and 1926. The "first real performance" of Ballet Mécanique was held on July 16, 1926, in Paris, and included eight pianos, xylophones, and percussion. Another early example, Cuban composer Amadeo Roldán's Rítmicas nos. 5 and 6 of 1930, made use of Cuban percussion instruments and rhythms. Rítmicas No. 5 requires eleven performers playing thirteen instruments, including claves, cowbells, maracas, the quijada, guiro, bongos, timbales, timpani, bass drum, and marimbula. However, it was Edgard Varèse's Ionisation that "opened the floodgates" and truly brought the percussion ensemble into the fold of contemporary composition. Premiered in 1933 under the baton of Nicholas Slonimsky, Ionisation is thematically structured and makes use of 13 performers playing over 30 different instruments, including Latin percussion instruments, drums, cymbals, sirens, a piano, chimes and glockenspiel.

Other noteworthy pieces were composed during the 1930s and 1940s, particularly on the West Coast of America by composers Henry Cowell, John Cage, Lou Harrison, and Johanna Beyer. The year 1939 saw the composition of Cage's First Construction (in Metal) and Harrison's Canticle no. 1. Béla Bartók's Sonata for Two Pianos and Percussion, written in 1937, was also an important piece for the development of percussion composition. The early 1940s resulted in Cage's second (1940) and third (1941) Constructions, Harrison's Fugue for Percussion (1941), as well as Cage and Harrison's collaboration Double Music (1941). Carlos Chávez's Toccata (1942) has also remained a standard work.

== After the Second World War ==
In the post-war period, many new works were composed for percussion ensemble. In 1960, Alberto Ginastera composed the Cantata para América Mágica, for soprano and large percussion ensemble. Carlos Chávez wrote his second such piece, Tambuco, in 1964. Iannis Xenakis composed two percussion sextets for Les Percussions de Strasbourg, Persephassa (1969), and Pléïades (1979), and in 1996 wrote Zythos, for trombone and six percussionists, for Christian Lindberg and the Kroumata Ensemble. Karlheinz Stockhausen composed a children's theatre piece for percussion sextet titled Musik im Bauch (Music in the Belly) in 1975, also for Les Percussions de Strasbourg, and in 2004 wrote a percussion trio titled Mittwoch Formel. The British composer and percussionist James Wood has contributed several works to the repertoire, including Stoicheia (1987–88), requiring over 600 instruments played by 16 percussionists, as well as electronics, Village Burial with Fire for percussion quartet (1989), and Spirit Festival with Lamentations, for quarter-tone marimba and four percussionists (1992).

=== Accreditation ===
The existence of percussion ensembles in music schools across the United States and beyond is due largely to Paul Price, who taught at the University of Illinois from 1949 to 1956 and established the first accredited percussion ensemble during his time there. His students at that time included Michael Colgrass, who, unsatisfied with the available percussion ensemble literature, composed for the ensemble and went on to become a Pulitzer-winning composer with Déjà Vu (1978), written for a percussion quartet with orchestra. Since the 1950s, the percussion ensemble has become a permanent part of the academic music world, and professional percussion ensembles such as Nexus have furthered the art form through commissions and worldwide performance. The Sousa Archives and Center for American Music holds the Paul Price Percussion Music and Papers, 1961–1982, which consists of percussion sheet music, sound recordings, and correspondence documenting Price's career as a percussion musician, and conductor of the Manhattan Percussion Ensemble.

=== Other significant composers ===
In addition to Beyer, Cage, Cowell, and Harrison, American composers who have made significant contributions to percussion ensemble literature include: Steve Reich, Howard J. Buss, Augusta Read Thomas, Christopher Rouse, William Russell, William Kraft, and Eric Ewazen.

== List of notable percussion ensembles ==
- Amadinda Percussion Group
- Blue Man Group
- Kroumata
- Nexus
- The Percussion Clique, Michael Aldan Bayard
- Les Percussions de Strasbourg
- M'Boom
- Scrap Arts Music
- So Percussion
- Stomp
- Tambuco
- Third Coast Percussion

== See also ==
- Gamelan
- Indoor percussion ensemble
- Noise in music
- 'ote'a
- Pungmul
- Rhythm band
- Samul nori
- Taiko
- Thayambaka
