= Long May You Run =

1976 album by the Stills-Young band

Studio album by The Stills–Young Band
- Released: September 20, 1976
- Recorded: February 16 – June 7, 1976
- Studios: Criteria Studios (Miami, Florida)
- Genre: Country rock
- Length: 39:10
- Label: Reprise
- Producers: Don Gehman; Stephen Stills; Neil Young

Stephen Stills chronology
Illegal Stills (1976)	Long May You Run (1976)	Still Stills: The Best of Stephen Stills (1976)

Neil Young chronology
Zuma (1975)	Long May You Run (1976)	American Stars 'n Bars (1977)

Singles from Long May You Run
- 1. "Long May You Run" / "12/8 Blues (All the Same)" Released: 1976; 2. "Midnight on the Bay" / "Black Coral" Released: 1976

Professional ratings
Review scores
Source	Rating
AllMusic	3/5 stars
Christgau's Record Guide	B

Long May You Run is a studio album credited to the Stills–Young Band, a collaboration between Stephen Stills and Neil Young, released in 1976 on Reprise Records. It peaked at No. 26 on the Billboard 200 and was certified gold in the United States by the RIAA. The album is the sole studio release by Stills and Young as a duo.

== Background ==
Following the Crosby, Stills, Nash & Young stadium tour of 1974, an attempt by the quartet to finalize a new album ended amidst acrimony without result. David Crosby and Graham Nash resumed their partnership, while Stills and Young continued their independent careers. Songs from the aborted CSNY album appeared on various albums by group members, and Stills covered two Young songs on his contemporary studio albums: "New Mama" on Stills and "The Loner" on Illegal Stills.

In early 1976, Stills and Young reached a rapprochement, and began to work on a joint album project from a desire by both to pick up where they left off with their Buffalo Springfield-era guitar explorations, a decade after the inception of the band. Crosby and Nash signed on as well, and briefly Long May You Run looked to be the awaited CSNY reunion album. However, on a deadline Nash and Crosby left Miami to finish the sessions for what would become their 1976 album Whistling Down the Wire, and Young and Stills reacted by removing the duo's vocals and other contributions from the master tapes. Crosby and Nash vowed never to work with either again, although less than a year later they would regroup with Stills for the album CSN.

In a 1981 Rockline interview, Young reflects on his working relationship with Stills and their collaboration on the album:

"I think it's been a pretty productive relationship inasmuch as there was a lot of balances that kept being adjusted and made the music alive really, especially in the earlier years. The Stills/Young band was a sort of attempt to wrap up something that we had started a long time ago. It really wasn't as hot as the early stuff we did. When we were about twenty we used to lock horns a bit and that was good for the group."

== Writing ==
Reflecting Young's apparent desire to tie up loose ends with Stills and CSNY, several of the songs Young brought to the album sessions had previously been attempted by the group in previous years. The album's title track was sung as a duet on CSNY's 1974 "Doom" tour. The chorus to "Ocean Girl" bears similarity to the Young/Nash collaboration "War Song", a single from 1972 in support of George McGovern. The guitar playing on "Fontainebleau" recalls "Pushed It Over the End", first recorded by the group during the 1974 tour. Unused songs "Traces" and "Human Highway" were also recorded during the sessions, as was "Separate Ways", the lead track on Young's then-unreleased 1975 album Homegrown. Master takes of each of these songs would appear on 2020's Neil Young Archives Volume II: 1972–1976.

The album's advance single, "Long May You Run", peaked at No. 71 on the UK singles chart. The song was an elegy for Neil Young's first car (which he nicknamed "Mort"), a 1948 Buick Roadmaster hearse that died in 1962 when its transmission blew in Blind River, Ontario. Mort was a different vehicle from the 1953 Pontiac hearse, nicknamed Mort 2, that Richie Furay, traveling with Stills, saw Young driving in a Hollywood traffic jam in 1966 that led to the formation of Buffalo Springfield. On January 22, 2010, Young performed "Long May You Run" on the final episode of The Tonight Show with Conan O'Brien. A few weeks later, Young performed the song during the closing ceremony of the 2010 Winter Olympics in Vancouver, accompanying the extinguishing of the Olympic cauldron.

== Recording ==
The album was recorded at Criteria Studios in Miami, Florida in the Spring of 1976. The duo was backed by Stills' backing band of the time, Joe Lala on percussion, Joe Vitale on drums, George "Chocolate" Perry on bass, and Jerry Aiello on organ. The group had all appeared on Stills' previous album Illegal Stills which had also been recorded at Criteria a few months prior with producer Don Gehman.

During the sessions, Young lived in a houseboat in Coconut Grove, as he explains in his memoir Waging Heavy Peace: "Back when I was living in Coconut Grove in Florida in the mid-seventies, there was a houseboat that I slept in that was owned by a lady named Heather. We were recording the Stills-Young Band's Long May You Run at Criteria Recording Studios, and it was quite a trip from the studio in Fort Lauderdale back to the Grove every night." The schedules of the two artists rarely overlapped during the sessions. Roadie Guillermo Giachetti remembers in Shakey: "There was a lotta friction from the start. Stills would stay in the studio all night, and then when Neil came back the next day, everybody would be wiped out. Stephen had this majestic mansion with a pool, Greek pillars and a fleet of rental cars, Neil stayed on a funky boat down in Coconut Grove."

In March, Young took a break from the sessions to tour Europe and Japan with his band Crazy Horse. Upon returning to the sessions, he invited Nash and Crosby to participate. The duo were finishing up their album Whistling Down the Wire, but were able to contribute some of their own songs, including "Taken at All" and add background vocals to the material Stills and Young had already completed. Nash recalls the sessions "flowing beautifully" until he and Crosby took a break to finalize the mixes for their own album, meeting a tight deadline. He remembers in his memoir Wild Tales:

"Unfortunately, by mid-May David and I had to get back to LA to finish our new album on time. 'We're sorry,' I told the others, 'but we have studio time booked. We have to go. Let's figure out when to continue this baby.' That's the moment when the shit hit the fan. Stephen insisted we stay and finish their album, and suddenly all the positive energy began to shift. You could feel it just get sucked out of the room. Something else was driving this sucker, and it didn't take us long to learn what it was. Elliot Roberts had a Stills/Young Band tour booked and ready to roll. They had to have an album to support the tour and were counting on us to make sure it got done. Hey, too bad. We had just as important a deadline, and we weren't about to scrap it for their tour."

Stills and Young made the decision to excise Crosby and Nash's contributions, and release the album as a duo in order to meet their own deadlines for the upcoming tour. Young quietly bailed on the sessions and returned to California. Nash did not take news well and unleashed a memorable tirade towards Stills and Young: "I think it's his cock he keeps putting in the meat grinder. Stephen's totally stupid, man... I'll thump that fucker right in the nose when I see him again. I see Stephen's career going downhill and I see Neil's career going downhill, and I don't give a shit. I WILL NOT work with them again." Angered, Nash would later refuse to allow Young to include "Pushed It Over the End" on his 1977 compilation Decade. By 1977, however, tempers would cool enough for Crosby, Stills and Nash to release a new studio album together.

== Tour ==
The Stills-Young Band, comprising Stills' then-current touring band behind the pair, began a tour in 1976 prior to the album's release. The tour commenced in Clarkston, Michigan on June 23, but after nineteen dates Young dropped out after July 20 via a telegram to Stills, forcing Stills to complete the concert tour solo through October. The telegram read: "Dear Stephen, funny how some things that start spontaneously end that way. Eat a peach. Neil."

Young would later cite cryptic personal reasons for his departure, namely that he had "voice issues" but he has since stated the tour "wasn't working" and that the "balance was off in some way" as it progressed. During the tour, critics were writing harsh reviews of Stills while praising Young, titled "Young Hot, Stills Not". Stills began drinking heavily and started to take out his frustrations on tour personnel thinking they were purposefully making him look bad. However, even after Young told Stills not to read the reviews, he would not accept the advice, so Young left.

== Track listing ==
=== Side one ===
1. "Long May You Run" (Young) (3:53)
  - Neil Young – guitar, harmonica, vocal; Stephen Stills – guitar, vocal; Joe Lala – percussion, vocal; Joe Vitale – drums, vocal; George "Chocolate" Perry – bass, vocal; Jerry Aiello – organ
  - Recorded at Criteria Studios, Miami, 2/5/1976. Produced by Stephen Stills, Neil Young & Don Gehman with special thanks to Tom Dowd.
2. "Make Love to You" (Stills) (5:10)
  - Stephen Stills – guitar, vocal; Neil Young – guitar, vocal; Joe Lala – percussion, vocal; Joe Vitale – drums, vocal; George "Chocolate" Perry – bass, vocal; Jerry Aiello – organ
  - Recorded at Criteria Studios, Miami, 4/13/1976. Produced by Stephen Stills, Neil Young & Don Gehman.
3. "Midnight on the Bay" (Young) (3:59)
  - Neil Young – acoustic guitar, harmonica, vocal; Stephen Stills – guitar, vocal; Joe Lala – percussion, vocal; Joe Vitale – drums, vocal; George "Chocolate" Perry – bass, vocal; Jerry Aiello – organ
  - Recorded at Criteria Studios, Miami, 2/19/1976. Produced by Stephen Stills, Neil Young & Don Gehman.
4. "Black Coral" (Stills) (4:41)
  - Stephen Stills – piano, vocal; Neil Young – electric guitar, Univox Stringman keyboard, vocal; Joe Lala – percussion; Joe Vitale – drums, flute; George "Chocolate" Perry – bass; Jerry Aiello – electric piano
  - Recorded at Criteria Studios, Miami, 4/19/1976. Produced by Stephen Stills, Neil Young & Don Gehman.
5. "Ocean Girl" (Young) (3:19)
  - Neil Young – piano, vocal; Stephen Stills – guitar, vocal; Joe Lala – percussion, vocal; Joe Vitale – drums, vocal; George "Chocolate" Perry – bass, vocal; Jerry Aiello – organ
  - Recorded at Criteria Studios, Miami, 4/14/1976. Produced by Stephen Stills, Neil Young & Don Gehman.

=== Side two ===
1. "Let It Shine" (Young) (4:43)
  - Neil Young – guitar, harmonica, vocal; Stephen Stills – guitar, vocal; Joe Vitale – drums; George “Chocolate” Perry – bass
  - Recorded at Criteria Studios, Miami, 2/4/1976. Produced by Stephen Stills, Neil Young & Don Gehman
2. "12/8 Blues (All the Same)" (Stills) (3:41)
  - Stephen Stills – guitar, vocal; Neil Young – guitar, vocal; Joe Lala – percussion, vocal; Joe Vitale – drums, vocal; George "Chocolate" Perry – bass, vocal; Jerry Aiello – electric piano
  - Recorded at Criteria Studios, Miami, 4/16/1976. Produced by Stephen Stills, Neil Young & Don Gehman.
3. "Fontainebleau" (Young) (3:58)
  - Neil Young – electric guitar, vocal; Stephen Stills – organ, vocal; Joe Lala – percussion, vocal; Joe Vitale – drums, vocal; George "Chocolate" Perry – bass, vocal; Jerry Aiello – piano
  - Recorded at Criteria Studios, Miami, 2/8/1976. Produced by Stephen Stills, Neil Young & Don Gehman with special thanks to Tom Dowd.
4. "Guardian Angel" (Stills) (5:40)
  - Stephen Stills – electric guitar, piano, vocal; Neil Young – electric guitar, vocal; Joe Lala – percussion, vocal; Joe Vitale – drums, vocal; George "Chocolate" Perry – bass, vocal; Jerry Aiello – organ
  - Recorded at Criteria Studios, Miami, 4/29/1976. Produced by Stephen Stills, Neil Young & Don Gehman.

== Personnel ==
- Stephen Stills – vocals, acoustic piano, guitars
- Neil Young – vocals, acoustic piano, string synthesizer, guitars, harmonica

Additional musicians

- Jerry Aiello – organ, acoustic piano
- George "Chocolate" Perry – bass, backing vocals
- Joe Vitale – drums, flute, backing vocals
- Joe Lala – percussion, backing vocals

Additional roles

- Stephen Stills – producer, mixing
- Neil Young – producer, mixing
- Don Gehman – producer, recording, mixing
- Tom Dowd – associate producer
- Steve Hart – recording assistant
- Michael Lasko – recording assistant
- Alex Sadkin – mixing
- Tom Wilkes – album design

== Charts ==
Album chart performance for Long May You Run
Chart (1976)	Peak position
Australia (Kent Music Report)	16
US Billboard Top LPs & Tape	26
UK Album Charts	12
Canadian RPM 100 Albums	35
Norwegian VG-lista Albums	19
New Zealand Album Charts	17
Dutch MegaCharts Albums	3
US Cash Box Top 100 Albums	15
US Record World Album Chart	22

Singles chart performance for Long May You Run
Year	Single	Chart (1976)	Peak position
1976	"Long May You Run"	US Record World Singles	122
1976	"Long May You Run"	Netherlands (Single Top 100)	18
1976	"Long May You Run"	France (Single Top 100)	76
1976	"Midnight On The Bay"	US Billboard Hot 100	105

== Certifications ==
Region	Certification	Certified units/sales
United Kingdom (BPI)	Silver	60,000^{^}
United States (RIAA)	Gold	500,000^{^}
^{^} Shipments figures based on certification alone.

== Tour ==
1976 North American Tour
- Tour by The Stills–Young Band
- Start date: June 23, 1976
- End date: July 20, 1976
- No. of shows: 22 (44 planned)

The Stills–Young Band concert chronology
- Stephen Stills 1975 Tour; Neil Young & Crazy Horse Europe and Japan Tour 1976; 1976 North American Tour; Stephen Stills 1976 Tour; Neil Young & Crazy Horse US Tour 1976

Tour
Date	City	Country	Venue	Attendance	Gross
23 June 1976	Clarkston	United States	Pine Knob Music Theatre	Sold Out	$138,995
24 June 1976	Clarkston	United States	Pine Knob Music Theatre	Sold Out	$138,995
26 June 1976	Boston	United States	Boston Garden	15,550/15,550	$127,000
27 June 1976	Springfield	United States	Civic Center	10,000	$70,000
29 June 1976	Philadelphia	United States	The Spectrum	18,500/18,500	$125,980
1 July 1976	Uniondale	United States	Nassau Coliseum		
2 July 1976	Uniondale	United States	Nassau Coliseum		
4 July 1976	Niagara Falls	United States	Convention Centre	9,000	$54,000
5 July 1976	Rochester	United States	Community War Memorial Auditorium	9,000/11,000	$60,071
7 July 1976	Providence	United States	Providence Civic Centre	18,781	$140,684
9 July 1976	Landover	United States	Capital Centre		
10 July 1976	Landover	United States	Capital Centre		
11 July 1976	Hartford	United States	Colt Park		$167,000
13 July 1976	Richfield	United States	Richfield Coliseum	14,815/19,276	$97,452
14 July 1976	Cincinnati	United States	Riverfront Coliseum	16,960/16,960	
15 July 1976	Pittsburgh	United States	Civic Arena	17,334/17,334	$117,371
17 July 1976	Greensboro	United States	Greensboro Coliseum	10,743	$83,785
18 July 1976	Charlotte	United States	Charlotte Coliseum		
20 July 1976	Columbia	United States	Carolina Coliseum	9,892	$65,128
~~21 July 1976~~	~~Atlanta~~	United States	~~Omni Coliseum~~ (Cancelled - *Young Gone)		
23 July 1976	Jacksonville	United States	Civic Auditorium		
24 July 1976	Miami	United States	Miami Baseball Stadium	12,231/22,000	$101,928
25 July 1976	Lakeland	United States	Lakeland Civic Center	9,000	$71,000
~~27 July 1976~~	~~Mobile~~	United States	~~Municipal Auditorium~~		
~~28 July 1976~~	~~Shreveport~~	United States	~~Hirsch Memorial Coliseum~~		
~~29 July 1976~~	~~Memphis~~	United States	~~Mid South Coliseum~~		
~~30 July 1976~~	~~Dallas~~	United States	~~Dallas Memorial Coliseum~~		
~~31 July 1976~~	~~Norman~~	United States	~~LLoyd Noble Center~~		
~~2 August 1976~~	~~Houston~~	United States	~~Sam Houston Coliseum~~		
~~3 August 1976~~	~~San Antonio~~	United States	~~Convention Center~~		
~~10 August 1976~~	~~Chicago~~	United States	~~Chicago Stadium~~		
~~13 August 1976~~	~~St. Paul~~	United States	~~Sports Centre~~		
~~14 August 1976~~	~~Milwaukee~~	United States	~~Summerfest Mainstage~~		
~~17 August 1976~~	~~San Francisco~~	United States	~~Cow Palace~~		
~~19 August 1976~~	~~Concord~~	United States	~~Concord Pavilion~~		
~~21 August 1976~~	~~San Diego~~	United States	~~Balboa Stadium~~		
~~24 August 1976~~	~~Inglewood~~	United States	~~The Forum~~		
~~29 August 1976~~	~~Denver~~	United States	~~Red Rocks Amphitheatre~~		
~~30 August 1976~~	~~Denver~~	United States	~~Red Rocks Amphitheatre~~		
~~31 August 1976~~	~~Denver~~	United States	~~Red Rocks Amphitheatre~~		
~~2 September 1976~~	~~Vancouver~~	Canada	~~PNE Coliseum~~		
~~4 September 1976~~	~~Seattle~~	United States	~~Seattle Coliseum~~		
~~8 September 1976~~	~~Edmonton~~	Canada	~~Unknown Venue~~		
~~10 September 1976~~	~~Calgary~~	Canada	~~Unknown Venue~~		

Personnel

- Jerry Aiello – organ
- Chris Hillman – guitar, vocals (for two dates after Young departed)
- Joe Lala – percussion
- George "Chocolate" Perry – bass guitar
- Stephen Stills – vocals, guitar, piano
- Joe Vitale – drums
- Neil Young – vocals, guitar, piano, harmonica

Setlist

This is the setlist from the Boston Garden date on the 26 June 1976

1. "Love the One You're With" (Stills)
2. "The Loner" (Young)
3. "Long May You Run" (Young)
4. "For What It's Worth" (Stills)
5. "Helpless" (Young)
6. "Black Queen" (Stills)
7. "Southern Man" (Young)
8. "On the Way Home" (Young)
9. "Change Partners" (Stills)
10. "Too Far Gone" (Young)
11. "4+20" (Stills)
12. "Word Game" (Stills)
13. "Buyin' Time" (Stills)
14. "Evening Coconut" (Young)
15. "Make Love to You" (Stills)
16. "Cowgirl in the Sand" (Young)
17. "The Treasure" (Stills)
18. "Suite: Judy Blue Eyes" (Stills)
