= Michael Alden Bayard =

American musician

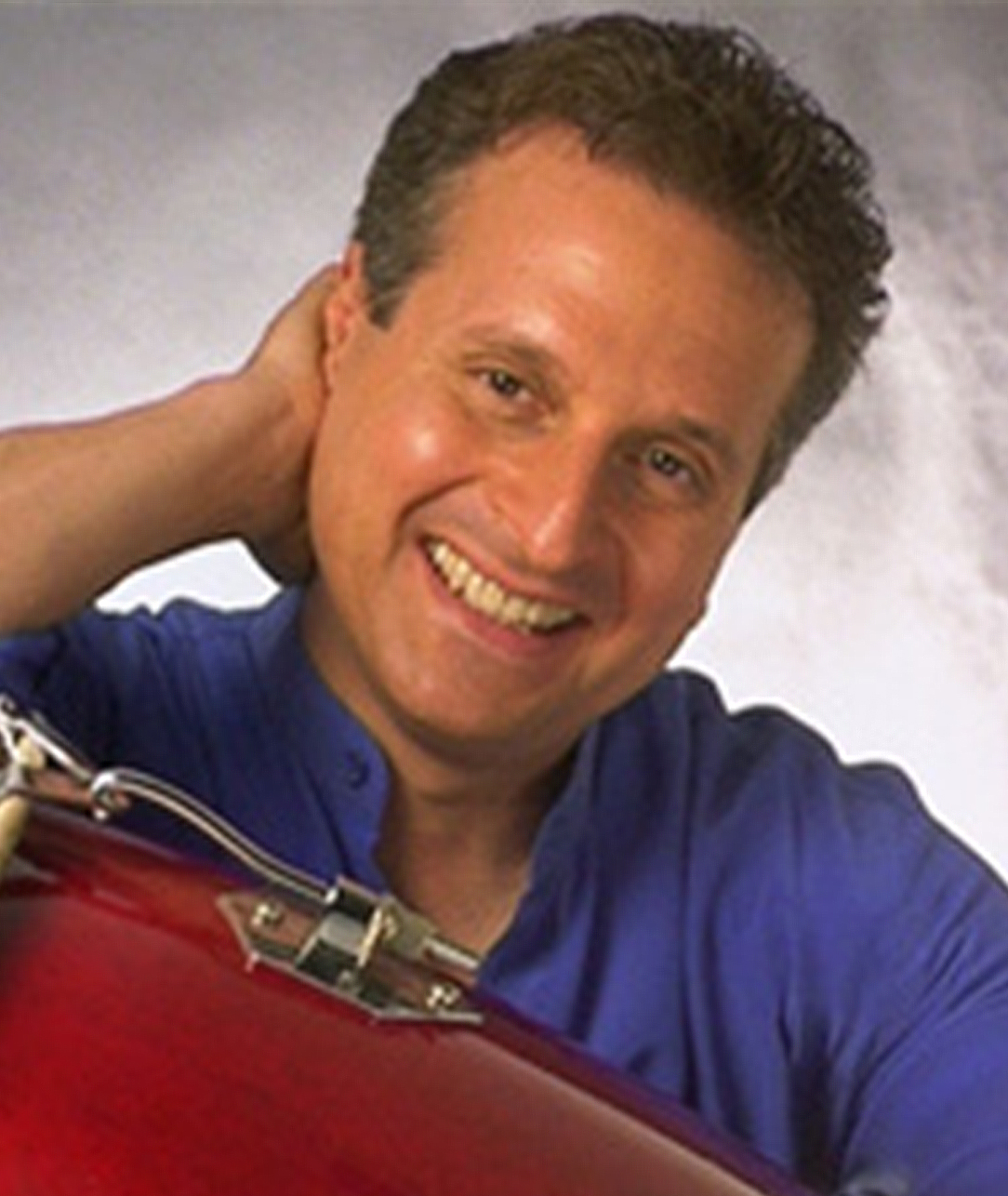

Michael Alden Bayard (born November 26, 1958) is an American percussionist, drummer, composer, recording artist, music lecturer, and author. A graduate of the Juilliard School of Music Pre-College Division and the Curtis Institute of Music who made his Carnegie Hall debut at age 16, Bayard has performed percussion and timpani under numerous conductors. As a percussion soloist, he served with the Sacramento Symphony as the principal percussionist for 17 years and has been featured with the Philadelphia Orchestra, Boston Pops Orchestra, New Jersey Symphony, Queens Symphony, Joffrey Ballet Orchestra, Jacksonville Symphony, Reno Philharmonic, Stockton Symphony, and Santa Rosa Symphony. Bayard currently performs with Grammy award-winning Mary Youngblood.

== Early life and education ==
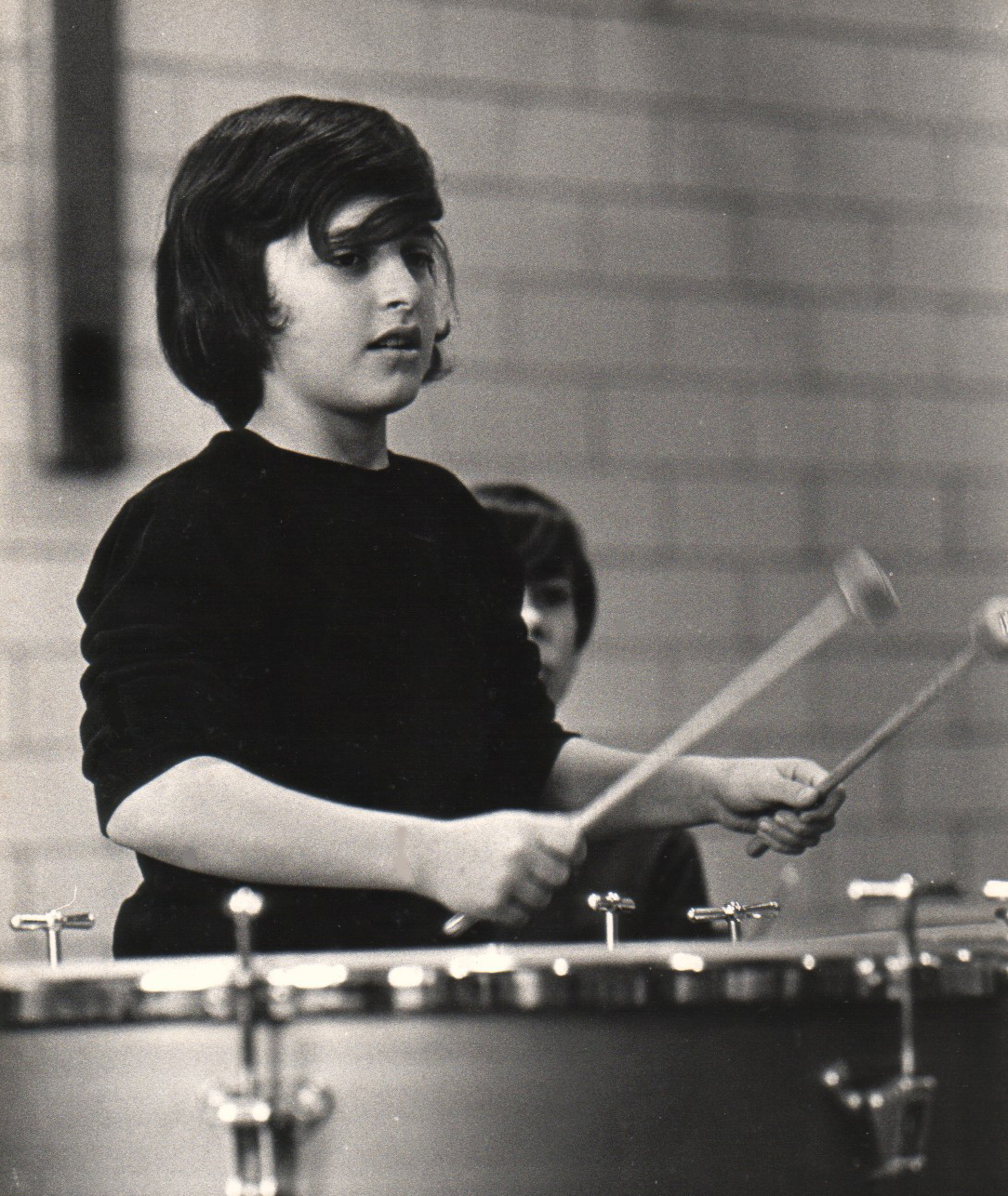
Bayard playing timpani at age 14

Michael Bayard was born in Manhattan, New York, and attended public school in Flushing, Queens. His father Leo Bayard was a professional actor who studied at the Max Reinhardt Theatre and is known for his work in the touring company of the Broadway play Detective Story (1949), and with Lux Video Theatre and the Philco-Goodyear Television Playhouse. His mother Betty Bayard (stage name Elizabeth George) was an actress who later operated a drama and dance school with his father in Queens, New York.

Bayard's parents encouraged his talents as a performer from a young age. At age 12, he began practicing diligently on a rubber drum pad in his basement in Flushing, Queens, developing both discipline and musical ability. During these basement years, Bayard was fascinated by dramatist and science fiction writer Rod Serling, inspired in part by Serling's development of his passion for the arts in his own family's basement.

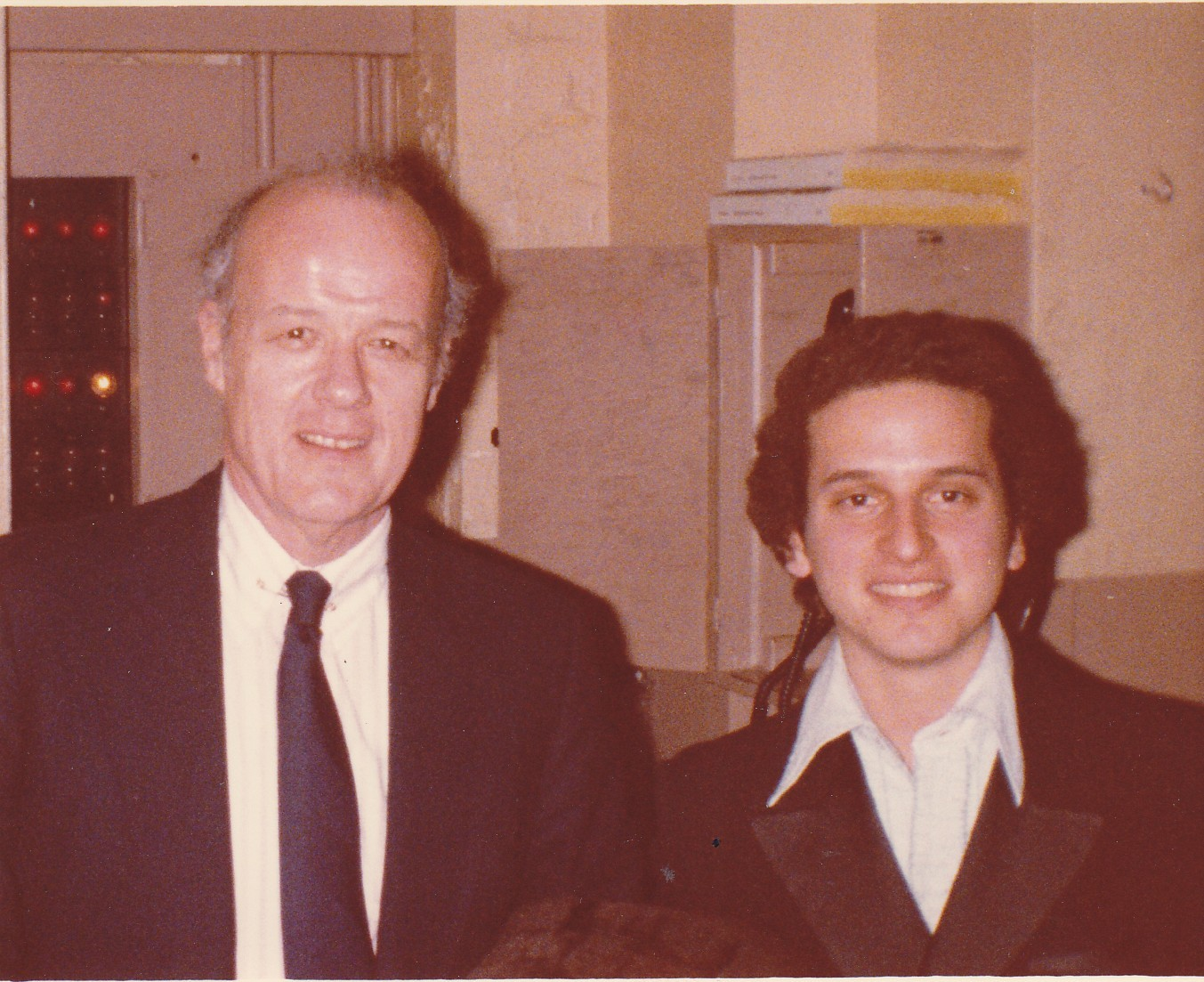
Bayard with John de Lancie (Director of the Curtis Institute of Music), 1979

At age 15, Bayard attended the Juilliard School of Music Pre-College Division on full scholarship, in the field of percussion and timpani. At 16, he performed his Carnegie Hall debut on solo percussion with the New York Youth Symphony. In 1975, at age 17, Bayard appeared as a musician in the notable Coca-Cola commercial "Look Up America." In 1976, Bayard attended the Curtis Institute of Music in Philadelphia on full scholarship. At Curtis, Bayard performed percussion and timpani under conductors Riccardo Muti, Claudio Abbado, Leonard Slatkin, Paul Paray, Klaus Tennstedt, Yuri Temirkanov, and Dmitri Kitayenko. At Curtis in 1977, Bayard was artifact consultant on the Leopold Stokowski Musical Instrument and Orchestral Score Collection, which included a collection of exotic and unusual musical instruments acquired by Stokowski during his world travels. There, he gained an appreciation of ancient instruments that would inform his later career. During his Curtis years, Bayard performed on percussion with the Queens Symphony Orchestra and the New Jersey Symphony. He also performed as part of duo with percussionist Andrew Power on a Philadelphia Orchestra program in Mallet Mania. In his final year with the Curtis Symphony Orchestra, Bayard played principal timpani in a performance of Igor Stravinsky's The Rite of Spring, conducted by Rafael Frühbeck de Burgos at the Academy of Music in Philadelphia. This particular performance is arguably considered one of the most intense and ferocious performances of this work in the last century.

During the summers from 1976 through 1985, Bayard played drum set in the show bands and lounge bands at several legendary Catskill Mountain resorts in upstate New York, namely Grossinger's, Kutsher's, and the Pines Hotel in the "Borscht Belt", and the Pine Springs Resort in Freehold, New York. During his Catskill summers, in the waning days of the Borscht Belt's glory years, Bayard worked with Frank Sinatra Jr., Enzo Stuarti, and Billy Daniels.

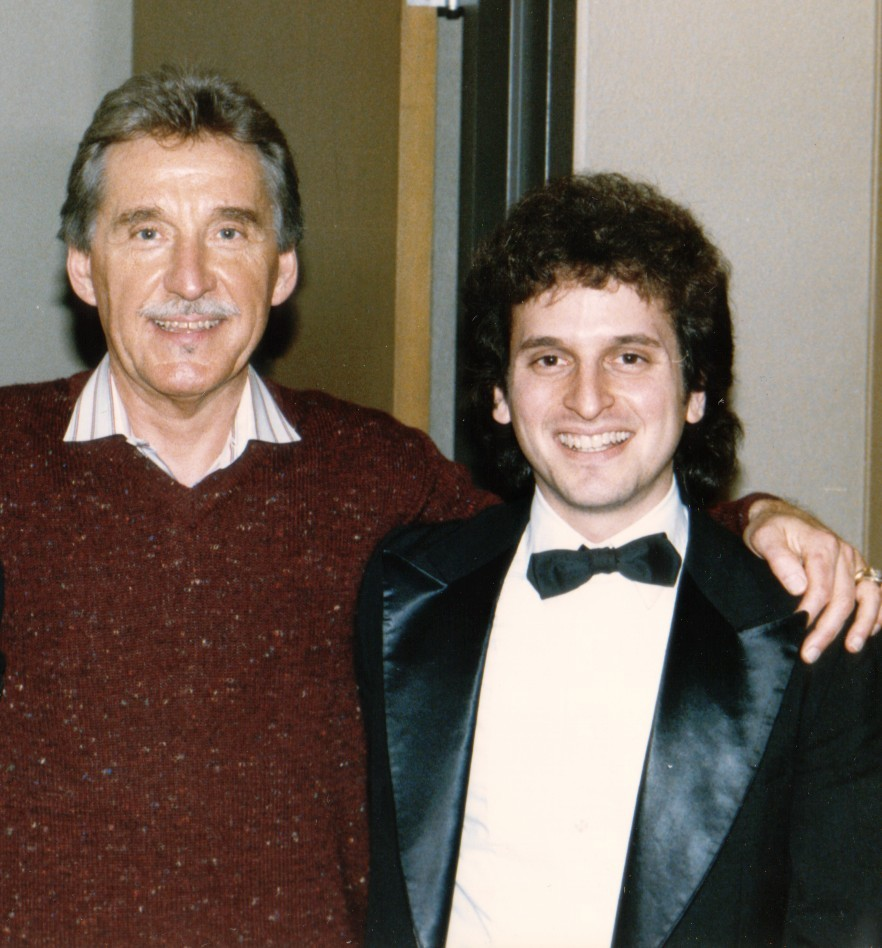
Bayard with Doc Severinsen after a performance in Sacramento, CA, 1987

== 1980s ==
After graduating Curtis in 1980, Bayard was appointed Principal Percussionist and Assistant Principal Timpanist of the Sacramento Symphony, a post he held for 17 years. During his symphony years, Bayard also worked with popular musicians from a wide range of genres, including Cab Calloway, Eartha Kitt, Mason Williams, Glen Campbell, Tony Bennett, Doc Severinsen, Mel Tormé, George Shearing, Joe Gilman, Dave Brubeck, Glenn Yarbrough, Ray Charles, The Fifth Dimension, Judy Collins, Henry Mancini, Chet Atkins, Carmen McRae, Carmen Dragon, and Peter Nero.

In the mid 1980s, Bayard composed several works for percussion ensemble and dance, namely Polynuclear Seizure (1983), the critically acclaimed Plastoid Plight (1984), and Voyage (1985).

In 1984, Bayard was appointed as Composer in Residence with the Dance Department at California State University, Sacramento (CSUS). There, he worked closely with choreographer Dale Scholl to create works for percussion and dance.

In 1989, Bayard was a founding member of the percussion trio The Percussion Clique who performed the West Coast premiere of composer Russell Peck's percussion concerto The Glory and the Grandeur, with the Sacramento Symphony.

From 1987 through 1992, Bayard was Contributing Editor and Editor of the Timpani Column for Percussive Notes, the official trade journal of the Percussive Arts Society.

== 1990s ==
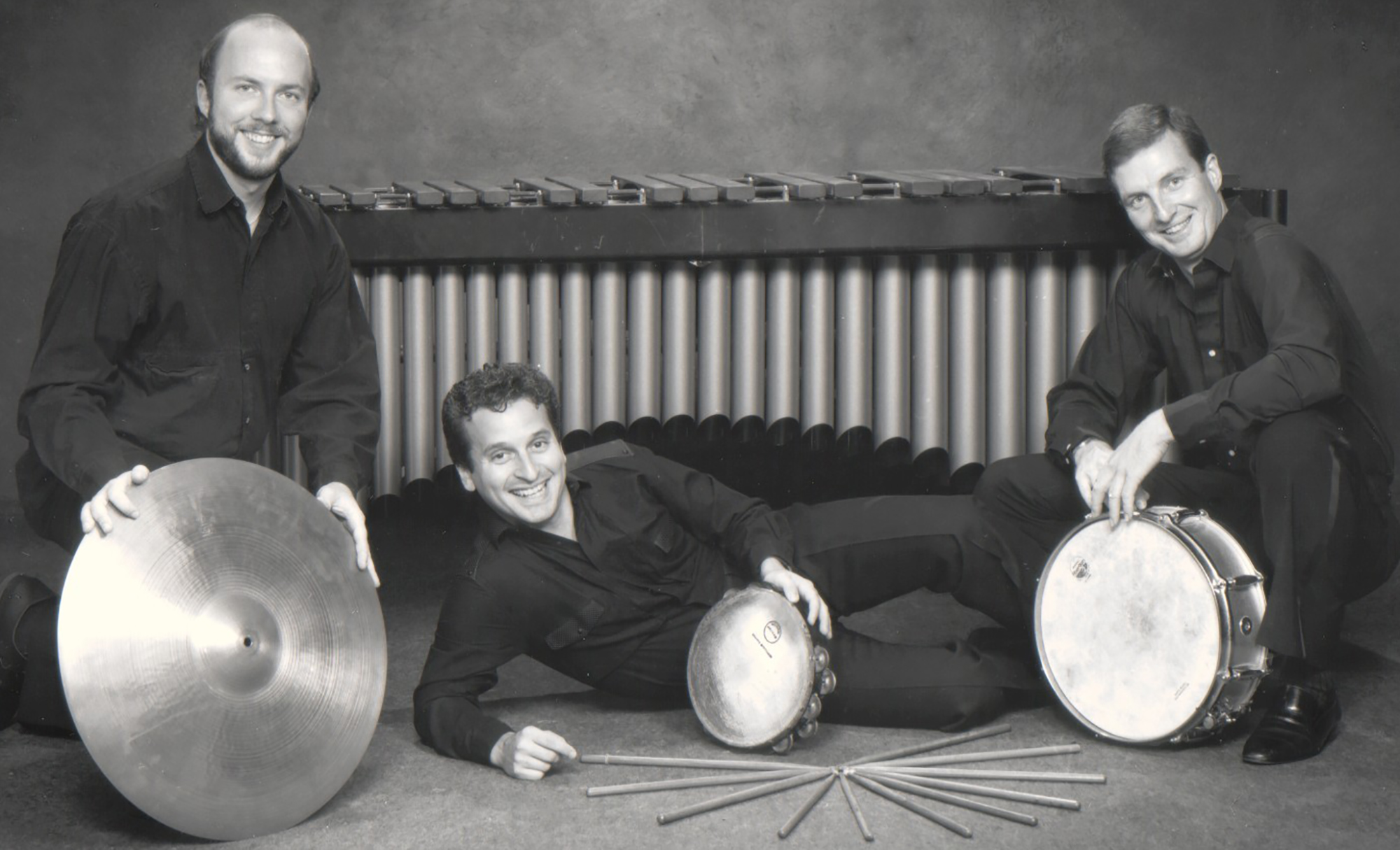
Bayard with "Percussion Clique," 1991

From 1989 through 1996, Bayard continued to make appearances with The Percussion Clique, as well as performing as soloist with the Stockton Symphony, Santa Rosa Symphony, Jacksonville Symphony, Reno Philharmonic, and Bear Valley Music Festival Orchestra (High Sierra Mountains of Northern California.)

In 1991, Bayard was featured percussionist with the avant-garde contemporary music ensemble "Music Now" founded by composer Howard Hersh. With this ensemble, Bayard performed works by composers Terry Riley, John Cage, George Crumb, and Astor Piazzolla. Bayard also performed on percussion in the American premiere of The Hundredth Monkey by Howard Hersh. This piece was inspired by the Balinese Monkey Chant, the great music ritual which uses vocal percussion to celebrate Prince Rama's rescue by a horde of monkeys.

In 1992, Bayard performed the Ingolf Dahl Duettino for Flute and Percussion with Paul Renzi, principal flautist with the San Francisco Symphony.

In 1993, Bayard joined violinist Sarn Oliver to form the Sarn Oliver Continuum.

In 1993, Bayard performed the Trio for Violin, String Bass, and Conga Drums by composer Charles Wuorinen, as part of a Chamber Music Society of Sacramento program.

In 1994, Bayard launched his company Rhythm Magic!® that offers an arts enrichment percussion performance to youth and adults throughout the United States. This performance engages a blend of percussion instruments from all over the world and hands-on student participation to inspire and motivate young people. This program provides a valuable lesson in how teamwork can bring about confidence, purpose, direction and the development of self-esteem.

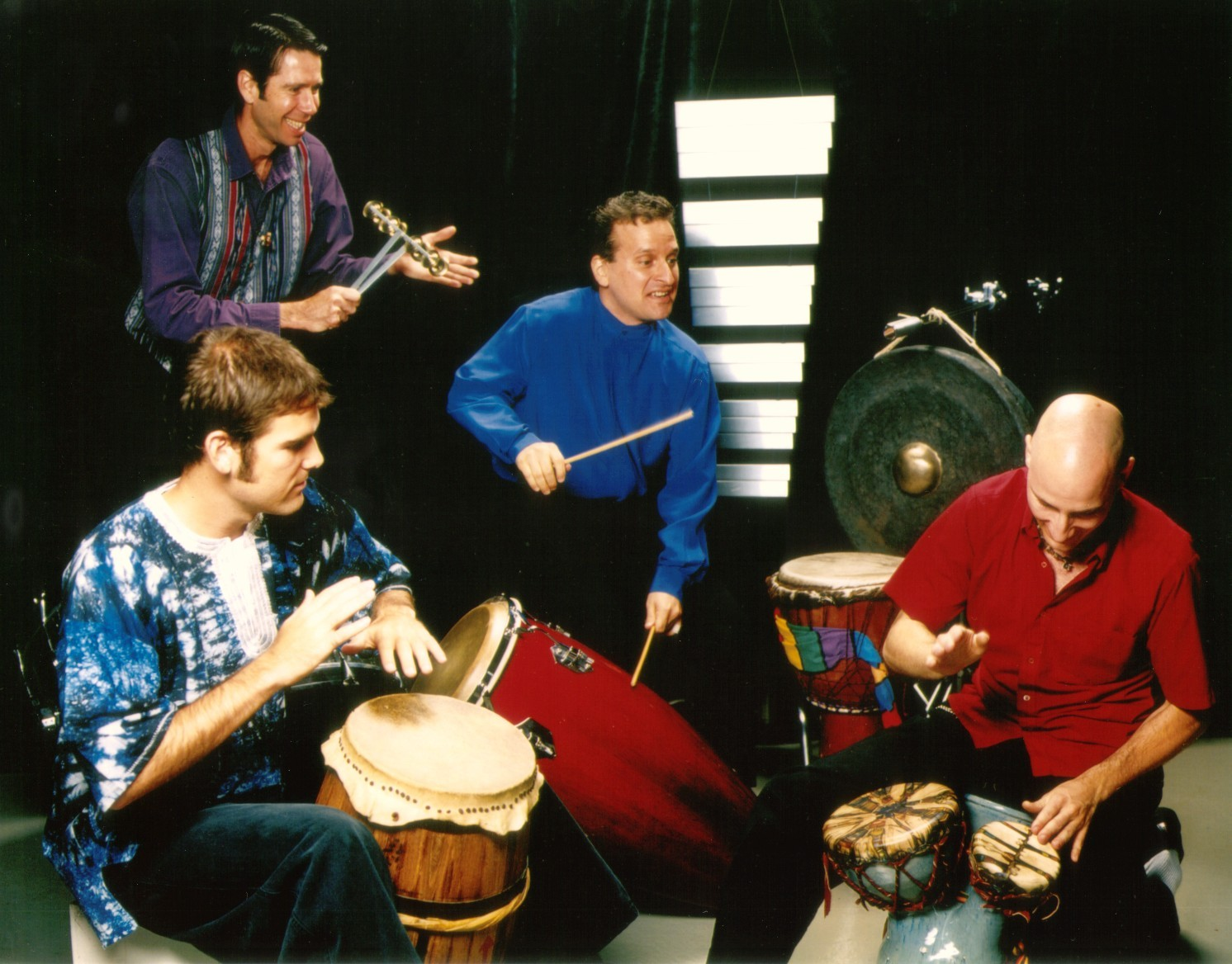
Bayard with "Dream Walker", 1997

Among the varied instruments used in Bayard's performances is the "Aerobell," a metallic part from a satellite that he both strikes and plays with a contrabass bow. In 1996, Bayard expanded the Rhythm Magic concept into a teambuilding and communication training program for corporations, companies, government departments, and boards of directors across the United States.

From 1994 through the present, Bayard has presented more than 2,000 performances of Rhythm Magic.

In 1997, Bayard presented a premiere of his composition Earthbound: An Experiential Work for Percussion and Electric Trio as part of the Bear Valley Music Festival in Northern California.

In 1998, Bayard played percussion and was a founding member of the "Star Lite Quintet," along with violinist Xiao You. This string quintet with percussion performed new arrangements of popular music including music of The Beatles, The Carpenters, and Cole Porter, plus classical favorites.

In January 1999, Bayard created and performed a musical program called "Artifacts Alive" at the Karshner Museum in Puyallup, Washington, incorporating ancient and rare instruments from around the world. Some of these rare artifacts, collected by Dr. Warner Karshner, a Puyallup pioneer, during his extensive travels and now part of the museum's collection, had not been played for 100 years.

In September of that year, Bayard became a founding member of the tribal percussion ensemble "Dream Walker." The group performed an original composition, "A Journey through Time" at Natomas Charter School Fine Arts Academy in Northern California. The album was recorded and published by Dream Walker in 1999.

== 2000s ==
From 2000 to 2009, Bayard performed with, recorded with, and was a member of several musical ensembles, namely "Phosphor Essence" (2001) and "Kloudnyne" (2006). In 2000, Bayard joined Hank Wesselman in a live performance.

In 2005, Bayard recorded the album Sol with the ensemble "Eclectic Café," playing drum kit and percussion. Eclectic Café comprised the scientist Tom Ford, playing steel string acoustic guitars, electric guitars, bass, and keyboards; and Doug McGehee, playing nylon and steel string acoustic guitars, electric guitars, and keyboards. Mastered by engineer Rainer Gembalczyk.

In 2007, Bayard launched his "World View Music Healing Series" with a concert featuring ancient musical instruments from the Middle East and the poetry of Rumi.

Throughout the late 2000s, Bayard continued his work in the field of sound healing and vibrational medicine, producing and performing in two more concerts in the World View Music Healing Series: World View Africa (2007) and World View Celtic Isles (2008).

From 2007 to present, Bayard has continued his collaborations with Native American flautist Mary Youngblood. One of their performances involved Youngblood playing a rare and fragile queña made from the quill of a condor feather.

Also in 2007, Bayard collaborated with composers Gavin Bowes and Wesley James Steck II on the premiere of Passage, a music and dance composition commissioned for the opening of the Benvenuti Performing Arts Center near Sacramento, California.

In 2008, Bayard performed and made a video recording of a musical adaptation of an ancient Hebrew prayer, the Shema, composed by Rita Glassman. Bayard was joined by vocalist Ann Roach on this performance.

Bayard continued his work in sound healing with live performance concerts, namely the Element Series (2007), the Planet Series (2008), and the Ancient Future Concert Series (2009).

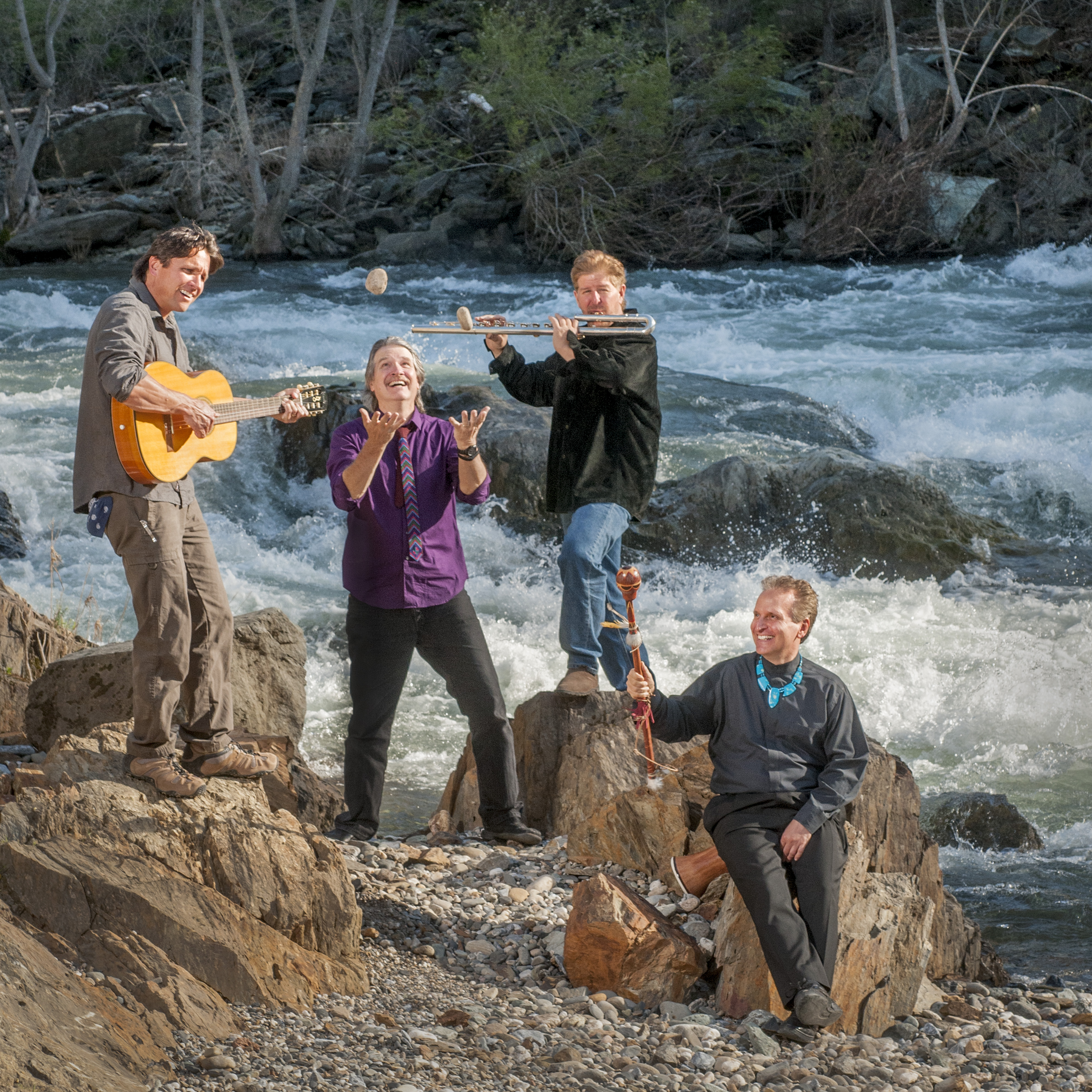
Bayard with "River Tribe," 2016

== 2010s ==
In 2010, Bayard produced and recorded the album Midnite Supper – Music for Healing, featuring vocalist Eva Caperon and guest musicians Mary Youngblood, Jerry Wood, Michael Wood, Robyn Wood, and Matthew Grasso.

In 2011, Bayard was featured on PBS/KVIE's Rob on the Road with Bayard's "Spin Cycle" video that shows Bayard playing percussion on the surfaces of an out-of-balance washing machine in spin cycle mode.

From 2009 through 2013, Bayard's sound healing concerts featured ancient and compelling themes. Performances included Drumming in the Outback: Music Healing from Aboriginal Australia (2009), Drumming in Shangri-La: Music Healing from the Enchanted Himalayas (2010), Atlantis Awakened: Music Healing from the Lost City (2010), The Thunderbird: Music Healing from Native American Country (2010), Secrets in the Fields: Music and Mysteries of the Crop Circles (2010), The Ancient Egypt Experience: Music, Mysteries, and Secrets of the Tomb (2011), The African Shamanic Experience: Music, Dreams, and Mysteries (2011), The Eagle and the Condor: Revealing the Prophecies and Unlocking the Secrets of the Ancient Incas (2011), The Enchanted Forest: Celtic Mysteries, Magic, and Medicine (2012), Mystic Islands: Music, Myth, and Magic of Ancient Hawaii (2012), and Full Moon at Stonehenge: Unlocking the Secrets of the Sacred Healing Portal (2013).

In 2013, Bayard produced and recorded the album "Passion – Songs from Source" featuring vocalist Ann Roach and guest musicians Mary Youngblood, Sarn Oliver, Shea A.J. Comfort, Matthew Grasso, Isaac James, and Borrina Mapaka.

In 2014, Bayard joined forces with Mary Youngblood to compose and perform the premiere of The Chakra Symphony: A Musical Journey through the Seven Chakras.

In 2015, Bayard and Youngblood collaborated again on an original music composition titled Voice of the Wind – A Meditative Native American Journey. The official DVD of the performance was released in 2015.

In 2016, Bayard co-founded the musical ensemble River Tribe, whose music is both ancient and futuristic. River Tribe released its debut album, Spirit Flight, in the fall of 2016.

== Discography ==
Michael Bayard has been included in the following compilations and soundtracks:

- Voice of the Wind with Mary Youngblood (Live CD&DVD) 2016, Pure Motion Media
- The Chakra Symphony with Mary Youngblood, 2015, Point Source/ Rhythm Magic Records
- Drumming the Rainbow Fire with Mary Youngblood, 2006, TralleArt Productions
- Sacred Healing Music Ceremony with Mary Youngblood, 2006, TralleArt Productions
- Mary Youngblood and Michael Bayard 2006, Rhythm Magic® Records and Christ Unity Church Productions
- Light Visions 2003, Position 3 Creations
- The Sensuality Experience 1995, V'tae Productions
- The Divine Wedding 1994, Caeleste Arc
- Sweet Surrender: Begin the Beguine 2006, Star Lite Records
- Sweet Surrender 1997, Star Lite Records
- Sol 2005, McGehee and Ford Publishing/Eclectic Café Records
- Village Dance 2003, Dream Walker Productions
- Works of Claude Bolling 1997, Klavier Records
- Spirit Flight 2016, Point Source
