= You Know I Know (band) =

- Origin: Winnipeg, Manitoba, Canada
- Genres: Punk rock, indie rock
- Years active: 1997–present
- Label: J
- Website: www.inwardeye.com

You Know I Know is a Canadian rock band comprising three brothers from Winnipeg, Manitoba, formerly known as Inward Eye.

== History ==
Singer and bassist Dave Erickson and his two brothers, guitarist Kyle and drummer Anders, originally formed in Winnipeg under the name Inward Eye. They started out by performing in bars, and later signed with J Records in 2005, and opened for The Who in 2006 in Winnipeg, Calgary, and Edmonton.

The band opened for the Oklahoma band Hinder in 2007; they then moved to California to work on recording and in 2009 they released a self-titled EP. The album contained their oft-performed song "You Know I Know". Later that year they went on a cross Canada tour with Flogging Molly.

Inward Eye played during the closing ceremony at the 2010 Winter Olympics in Vancouver, British Columbia. In 2013, after several years of inactivity, the brothers changed their band name to You Know I Know, and performed a come-back show in St. Boniface, Manitoba.
