= Anatoly Pakhomov =

Russian politician

- Анатолий Пахомов
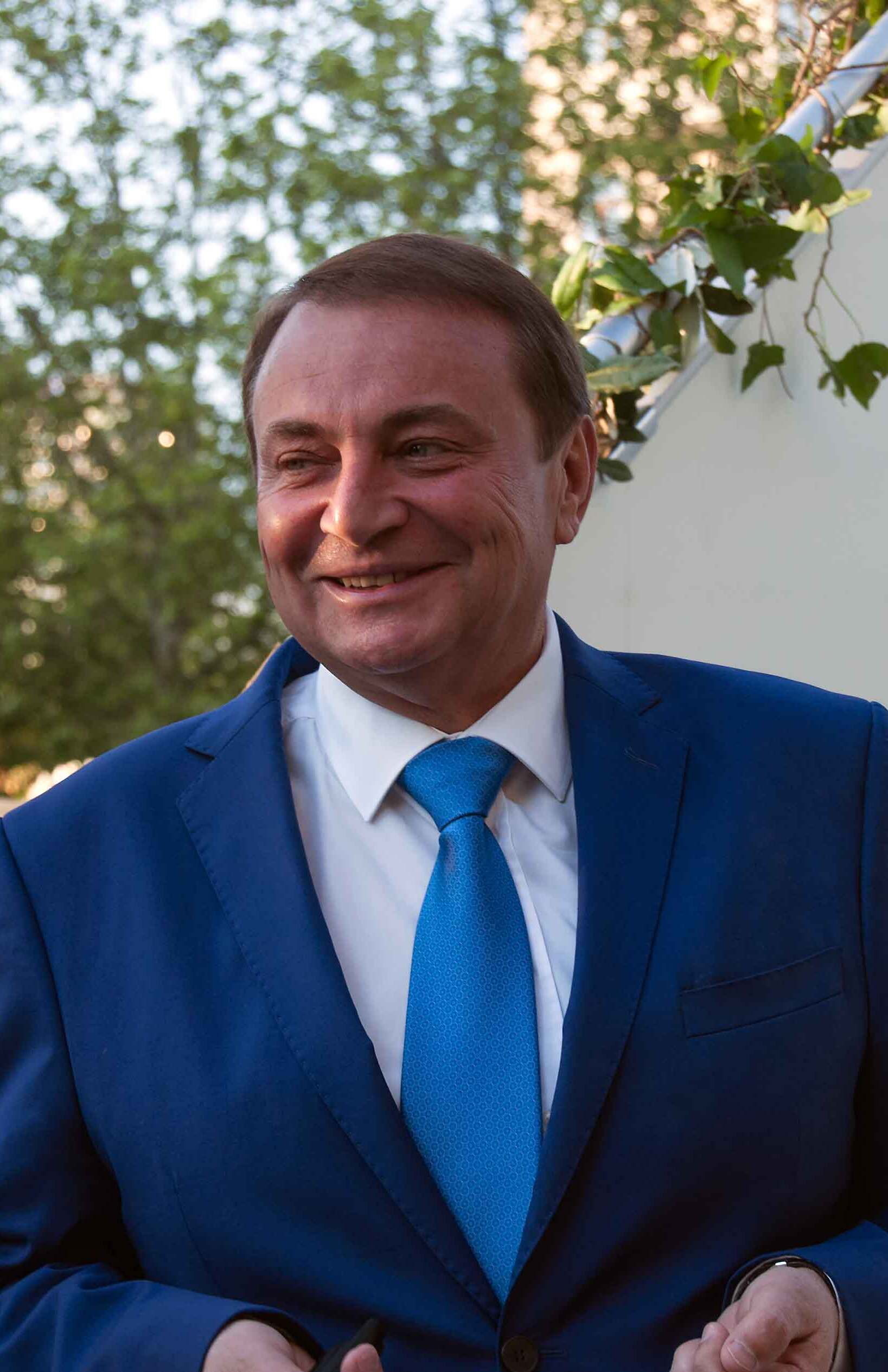

Head of Sochi
- In office 26 April 2009 – 9 September 2019
- Preceded by: Vladimir Afanasenkov
- Succeeded by: Alexey Kopaigorodsky

Personal details
- Born: 2 September 1960 (age 66) Novoarkhangelskaya, Krasnodar Krai, Russian SFSR, USSR
- Party: United Russia
- Education: Kuban State Agrarian University

Anatoliy Nikolayevich Pakhomov (Russian: Анатолий Николаевич Пахомов; born 1960 in Krasnodar Krai) is a Russian politician who was the mayor of Sochi.

Pakhomov served as the mayor of the town of Anapa from 2005 until 2008. In October 2008 Pakhomov became the fourth occupant of the mayoralty of Sochi since the announcement of the city as the host of the 2014 Winter Olympics.

On 24 March 2009 the United Russia party announced that Pakhomov would be its candidate for the April 26 elections for mayor of Sochi. On 27 April 2009 it was announced that Pakhomov had won the election with 77% of the vote. Boris Nemtsov, who came second with around 14% of the vote, contested the fairness of the election, alleging that he was denied media access and that government workers had been pressured to vote for Pakhomov.

Pakhomov received the Olympic flag from IOC president Jacques Rogge at the 2010 Winter Olympics closing ceremony.

Prior to the 2014 Winter Olympics in Sochi, Pakhomov claimed that homosexuality was not accepted in the Caucasus and that there were no gay people in Sochi.

In August 2019, Pakhomov announced that he would not run for a new term. His term of office ended on 9 September 2019, and Alexey Kopaigorodsky was elected the new mayor of Sochi.

== Awards and honours ==
In 2014, Pakhomov was awarded the Paralympic Order.
