= Heads of Sochi =

Head of Sochi
- Flag of Sochi
- Incumbent; Andrey Proshunin since 19 July 2024
- City Assembly of Sochi
- Appointer: City Assembly of Sochi
- Inaugural holder: Nikolay Karpov
- Formation: December 1991 (Modern office)
- Website: sochi.ru

The Head of the City of Sochi (Russian: Глава города Сочи), also referred to as the Mayor of Sochi, is the highest ranking official and head of the executive branch of the city of Sochi, Russia.

== List of Heads of Sochi (1991–present) ==
Name	Term Start	Term End
Nikolay Karpov	December 1991	2000
Leonid Mostovoy	2001	2003
Viktor Kolodyazhny	2004	17 April 2008
Vladimir Afanasenkov	29 June 2008	30 October 2008
Dzhamvulat Khatuov (acting)	30 October 2008	20 January 2009
Anatoly Pakhomov	12 May 2009	9 September 2019
Alexey Kopaigorodsky	11 September 2019	14 May 2024
Andrey Proshunin	19 July 2024	Present

== Previous leaders of Sochi (until 1991) ==
=== Russian Empire ===
==== City Elders ====
- Reinhold Garbe (1874-1875)
- Nikolai Kostarev (1898-1902)
- Ivan Godzi (1902-1904)
- Sergei Savich (1904)
- Anatoly Bonker (1905)
- Dmitry Prilukov (1905-1908)
- Anton Tarnopolsky (1908)
- Fyodor Klochanov (1908—1911)
- Nikolai Kostarev (1911)
- Alexey Kartashov (1913—1914)
- Dmitry Kochenovsky (Acting, 1915-1917)

=== Soviet Union ===
==== Chairmen of the Sochi City Executive Committee ====
- Yevgeny Lechno (June 13, 1917 — ?)
- Morozov
- M. Probenko, M. (September 20, 1920 — ?)
- Nikifor Poyarko (1921—1922)
- Pavel Prima (1928)
- Nikolai Motuzko (? — 1934)
- Alexei Belous (1938—1944)
- Bezrukov (1946)
- Dmitry Vasilyev (1956)
- A. Bykov (1958)
- Albert Churkin (1958—1962)
- Pyotr Bazhanov (1963—1971)
- Vyacheslav Voronkov (1974—1977)
- Anatoly Udotov (1977—1982)
- Vladimir Molyarenko (1982—1989)
- Sergey Derendyaev (1989—1991)

==== First Secretaries of the Sochi City Committee of the CPSU ====
- Sergei Medunov (1959-1969)
- Yuri Polyakov (1982-1990)

==== Authorized representatives of the Central Executive Committee and the Council of People's Commissars in the Sochi Region for Resort Issues ====
- Alexander Metelev (October 17, 1933 – June 1937)
- Ivan Vargin (Acting, June 1937 - November 20, 1937)

== See also ==
- Mayor of Moscow
- Governor of Saint Petersburg
