= Stamping Ground (ballet) =

Stamping Ground is a contemporary dance choreographed in 1983 by Jiří Kylián to Carlos Chávez's Toccata for Percussion Instruments. It was inspired by the traditional dances of the Aboriginal Australians.
