= Jiří Kylián =

Czech former dancer and contemporary dance choreographer

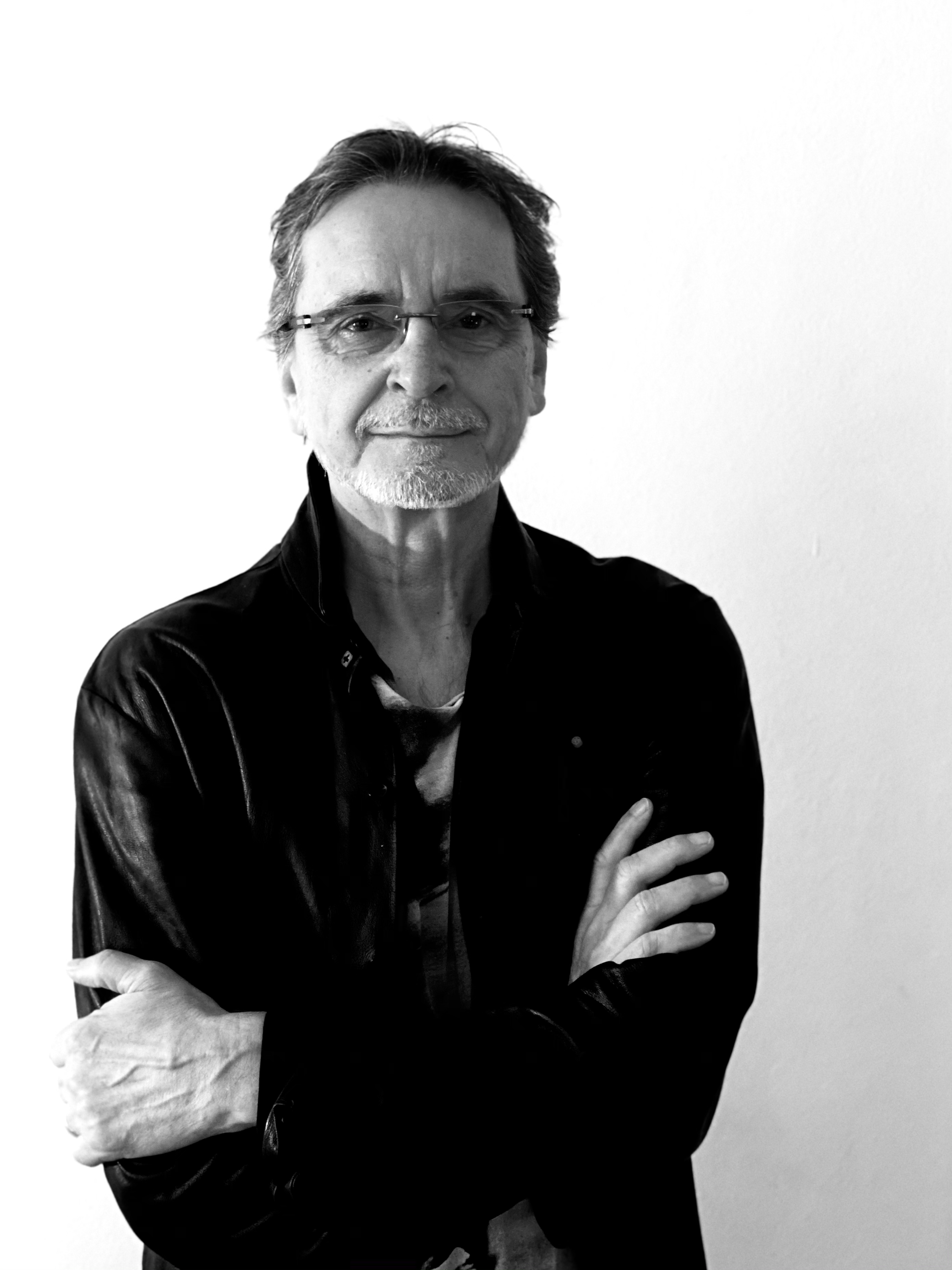
- Jiří Kylián (2020)
- Born: 21 March 1947 (age 79); Prague, Czechoslovakia
- Occupation: contemporary dance choreographer
- Website: www.jirikylian.com

Jiří Kylián (born 21 March 1947) is a Czech former dancer and contemporary dance choreographer. He is considered one of the greatest contemporary dance choreographers in Czech history.

== Life ==
Jiří Kylián was born in 1947 in Prague, Czechoslovakia, to his father Václav who was a banker and to his mother Markéta, who was as a young teenager a dancer-child protégée.

Initially inspired by the acrobatic performances of the Circus Busch, Kylián decided to pursue professional ballet training at the School of the National Ballet Prague at the age of 9, after having seen a ballet performance for the first time. Kylián was admitted to the Prague conservatory in 1962. Here, he encountered one of his mentors, teacher and former dancer Zora Šemberová, "who left a deep mark in Jiří's professional development". At the conservatory Kylián made his first steps as a choreographer with Nine Eighth's, choreographed to jazz music, and Quartet, to music by Béla Bartók. In 1967, Kylián received a scholarship to study at the Royal Ballet School in London. Among other artists, Kylián met choreographer John Cranko, who offered him to join the Stuttgart Ballet.

== Work ==
He joined the Stuttgart Ballet in 1968 and worked under Cranko, where he began to work as a choreographer. At Stuttgart Ballet Kylián started choreographing with Paradox (1970), Kommen und Gehen (1970), and continued in the Stuttgart Ballet's Noverre Kompanie with Incantations (1971), Einzelgänger (1972) and Blaue Haut (1974), among others.

Three years after the death of Cranko (1973), Kylián became Artistic Director of Nederlands Dans Theater (NDT) in 1976. His best known works for NDT include Symphony of Psalms (1978), Stamping Ground (1983), Dream Time (1983), and Silent Cries (1986). His style included exploration of the limitations and capabilities of space, body parts, entrances and exits, contrasts, and humor.

Both Jiří Kylián's works created in 1983, Stamping Ground and Dream Time, were inspired by his personal interests and travels to Aboriginal Australia, as documented by director Hans Hulscher in the documentary, Road to the Stamping Ground. Aboriginal ceremonial dances are used as blueprints within the work Stamping Ground, which included among its original cast Nacho Duato and Jim Vincent.

During Kylián's directorship at the NDT, a second company for younger dancers was created, Nederlands Dans Theater 2 (NDT II).

In 1992, he started a chamber company for dancers over 40, Nederlands Dans Theater 3 (NDT III).

Kylián's main works include:

=== Forgotten Land (1981) ===
Forgotten Land 1981 explores memories, events and people that over time are lost or forgotten and how people sometimes vainly try to recover them, or a sense of them in order to regain their former power and value. The work itself is inspired and based on a painting of women on a beach by the Norwegian Expressionist painter Edvard Munch. The work mainly involves duets who move their arms in various stretched positions, as if they were reaching out for something. The dancers arch their backs and dance expressively, reflecting both the music and the haunting painting that influenced the work. Kylián makes a statement of lost homelands, lost lovers and lost times and there are also duets that reflect violent moods. These duets end up as a large ensemble and then the women are left on the shore, stretching their arms again like birds that cannot fly.

=== Falling Angels (1989) ===
Falling Angels is a part of the Black and White ballets, which were created in 1989 with 8 white female dancers dressed in black leotards. It was performed to drumming/percussion music based on ceremonial ritual music from Ghana (West Africa). Musical rhythms and patterns are used and mixed in a synthesizer to produce a layered effect in some sections. The result of this a more energetic, sometimes frenzied sound that the dancers match in a very physical dance.

Falling Angels depicts females and female dancers in their aim to achieve perfection but succumb in various stages to the human female psyche and female events such as ambition, seduction, pregnancy, birth, death, motherhood and self-awareness. It is about the things that pull and push a dancer from the 'purity' of dance and performance. Kylián was influenced by surrealism and minimalism during the creation of this work and the 'black and white ballets'. In this ballet we see the combination of classical lines and sharp percussive movements that give unpredictability to the piece as a whole.

=== Petite Mort (1991) ===
Petite Mort was composed for the 1991 Salzburg Festival on the second centenary of Mozart's death with six men, six women, and six foils. Assistant choreographer was Roslyn Anderson, costumes by Joke Visser, and music by Wolfgang Amadeus Mozart included Piano Concerto in A major – Adagio and Piano Concerto in C major – Andante.

=== Other works ===
Theatre works from 1973 to 2014

- Paradox (1970) Stuttgarter Ballett
- Kommen und gehen (1970) Stuttgarter Ballett
- Incantations (1971) Stuttgarter Ballett
- Der Einzelgänger (1972) Stuttgarter Ballett
- Der stumme Orpheus (1972) Stuttgarter Ballett
- Viewers (1973) Nederlands Dans Theater
- Blaue Haut / Blue skin (1974) Stuttgarter Ballett
- Der Morgen danach (1974) Stuttgarter Ballett
- Stoolgame (1974) Nederlands Dans Theater
- La Cathédrale engloutie (1975) Nederlands Dans Theater
- Rückkehr ins fremde Land / Return to a strange land (1975) Stuttgarter Ballett
- Verklärte Nacht / Transfigured night (1975) Nederlands Dans Theater
- Torso (1975) Nederlands Dans Theater
- Nuages (1976) Stuttgarter Ballett
- Elegia (1976) Nederlands Dans Theater
- Symphony in d (1976) Nederlands Dans Theater
- November steps (1977) Nederlands Dans Theater
- Ariadne (1977) Nederlands Dans Theater
- Kinderspelen (1978) Nederlands Dans Theater
- Sinfonietta (1978) Nederlands Dans Theater
- Intimate pages (1978) Sabine Kupferberg
- Rainbow snake (1978) Nederlands Dans Theater
- Psalmensymfonie / Symphony of Psalms (1978) Nederlands Dans Theater (NDT I)
- Glagolitic Mass (1979) Nederlands Dans Theater (NDT I)
- Dream dances (1979) Nederlands Dans Theater (NDT I)
- Soldatenmis / Field Mass (1980) Nederlands Dans Theater (NDT I)
- Overgrown path (1980) Nederlands Dans Theater (NDT I)
- Forgotten land / Vergessenes Land (1981) Stuttgarter Ballett
- Nomaden / Nomads (1981) Nederlands Dans Theater (NDT I)
- Svadebka (1982) Nederlands Dans Theater (NDT I)
- Lieder eines fahrenden Gesellen / Songs of a Wayfarer (1982) Nederlands Dans Theater (NDT I)
- Stamping Ground (1983) Nederlands Dans Theater (NDT I)
- Dream time (1983) Nederlands Dans Theater (NDT I)
- Curses and blessings (1983) Nederlands Dans Theater (NDT I)
- Wiegenlied (1983) Nederlands Dans Theater (NDT I and II)
- Return to a strange land (1984) Nederlands Dans Theater (NDT I)
- Valencia (1984) Nederlands Dans Theater (NDT I)
- L'enfant et les sortilèges (1984) Nederlands Dans Theater (NDT I)
- Heart's labyrinth ( 1984) Nederlands Dans Theater (NDT I)
- Heart's labyrinth II (1985) Nederlands Dans Theater (NDT I)
- Piccolo mondo (1985) Scapino Ballet
- Silent cries (1986) Nederlands Dans Theater (NDT I)
- L'Histoire du soldat (1986) Nederlands Dans Theater (NDT I)
- Sechs Tänze / Six dances (1986) Nederlands Dans Theater (NDT I)
- Frankenstein !! (1987) Nederlands Dans Theater (NDT I)
- Sint joris rijdt uit (1987) Nederlands Dans Theater (NDT I)
- Evening songs (1987) Nederlands Dans Theater (NDT I)
- Kaguyahime (1988) Nederlands Dans Theater (NDT I)
- No more play (1988) Nederlands Dans Theater (NDT I)
- Tanz-schul (1989) Nederlands Dans Theater (NDT I)
- Falling angels (1989) Nederlands Dans Theater (NDT I)
- Sweet dreams (1990) Nederlands Dans Theater (NDT I)
- Sarabande (1990) Nederlands Dans Theater (NDT I)
- Feuillet d'automne (1990) Ballet de l'Opéra National de Paris
- Un ballo (1991) Nederlands Dans Theater (NDT II)
- Petite mort (1991) Nederlands Dans Theater (NDT I)
- Obscure temptations (1991) Nederlands Dans Theater (NDT III)
- Stepping stones (1991) Stuttgarter Ballett
- As if never been (1992) Nederlands Dans Theater (NDT I)
- No sleep till dawn of day (1992) Nederlands Dans Theater (NDT III)
- Whereabouts unknown (1993) Nederlands Dans Theater (NDT I)
- Tiger lily (1994) Nederlands Dans Theater (NDT I)
- Perfect conception (1994) The Tokyo Ballet
- Double you (1994) Nederlands Dans Theater (NDT III)
- Arcimboldo (1994) Nederlands Dans Theater I / II / III
- Bella Figura (1995) Nederlands Dans Theater (NDT I)
- Anna and the ostriches (1996) Nederlands Dans Theater (NDT I)
- Tears of laughter (1996) Nederlands Dans Theater (NDT III)
- Trompe-l'œil (1996) Nederlands Dans Theater (NDT II)
- If only… (1996) Nederlands Dans Theater (NDT III)
- Compass (1996) Nederlands Dans Theater (NDT III)
- Wings of wax (1997) Nederlands Dans Theater (NDT I)
- A way a lone (1998) Nederlands Dans Theater (NDT III)
- One of a kind (1998) Nederlands Dans Theater (NDT I)
- Indigo rose (1998) Nederlands Dans Theater (NDT II)
- Half past (1999) Nederlands Dans Theater (NDT I)
- Doux mensonges (1999) Ballet de l'Opéra National de Paris
- Arcimboldo 2000 (2000) Nederlands Dans Theater I / II / III
- Click – pause – silence (2000) Nederlands Dans Theater (NDT I)
- Birth-day (2001) Nederlands Dans Theater (NDT III)
- Blackbird (2001) Saitama Arts Theater
- Claude Pascal (2002) Nederlands Dans Theater (NDT I)
- When time takes time (2002) Saitama Arts Theater and Nederlands Dans Theater III
- Far too close (2002) Saitama Arts Theater and Nederlands Dans Theater III
- Last touch (2003) Nederlands Dans Theater (NDT I)
- Il faut qu'une porte (2004) Ballet de l'Opéra National de Paris
- Sleepless (2004) Nederlands Dans Theater (NDT II)
- Toss of a dice (2005) Nederlands Dans Theater (NDT I)
- Chapeau (2005) Nederlands Dans Theater (NDT II)
- Tar and feathers (2006) Nederlands Dans Theater (NDT I)
- Vanishing twin (2008) Nederlands Dans Theater (NDT I)
- Last touch first (2008) Nederlands Dans Theater (NDT I)
- Gods and dogs (2008) Nederlands Dans Theater (NDT II)
- Zugvögel (2009) Bayerisches Staatsballett München
- Mémoires d'oubliettes (2009) Nederlands Dans Theater (NDT I)
- Anonymous (2011) Kylworks
- East shadow (2013) Aichi Mini Theatre
- Fortune cookies (2014) Kylworks
- Inauguration (2019)

Films from 2006 to 2017

- Car-Men (2006)
- Between entrance and exit (2013)
- Schwarzfahrer (2014)
- Scalamare (2017)

== Awards ==
- 1994 Dance Magazine Award New York
- 1995 Decoration of the Royal Dutch order of Oranje-Nassau
- 1997 Golden Medal for Outstanding Merit from President Václav Havel, Prague
- 2000 Sir Laurence Olivier Award, London
- 2000 Honorary Doctorate, Music Academy of Prague
- 2000 Three "Nijinsky award", Monte Carlo; in the following categories: as choreographer, for choreography, for company (for unique structure of NDT: NDT I, NDT II, NDT III)
- 2001 Commandeur de l’Ordre des Arts et des Lettres, Paris
- 2006 Thalia Award – College Special Award (Czech Republic)
- 2008 Golden Lion for Lifetime Achievement, Biennale Venezia
- 2011 Award for exceptional achievement in the field of Dance and Choreography, Czech Ministry of Culture, Prague
- 2018 Chevalier de la Légion d'Honneur, Member of Institute Français, Académie des Beaux Arts, Paris
- 2024 Commanders of the Order of the White Lion

== See also ==
- List of dancers
