= Ariana Chris =

Greek-Canadian mezzo-soprano

Ariana Chris (born Ariadni Christodoulopoulos; Greek: Αριάδνη Χριστοδουλοπούλου; on 26 September 1975 in Toronto, Ontario) is a Greek-Canadian mezzo-soprano. She is a graduate of the University of Toronto, and received additional training as a member of both the Atelier lyrique de l'Opéra de Montréal and the Apprentice Program for Singers of The Santa Fe Opera. In 2005, she represented Greece in the BBC Cardiff Singer of the World Competition. On 19 October 2007, she made her debut with New York City Opera as Lola in Pietro Mascagni's Cavalleria rusticana. On 28 February 2010, she performed the Greek National Anthem for the 2010 Winter Olympics closing ceremony.
