= 2010 Winter Olympics closing ceremony =

- Part of 2010 Winter Olympics
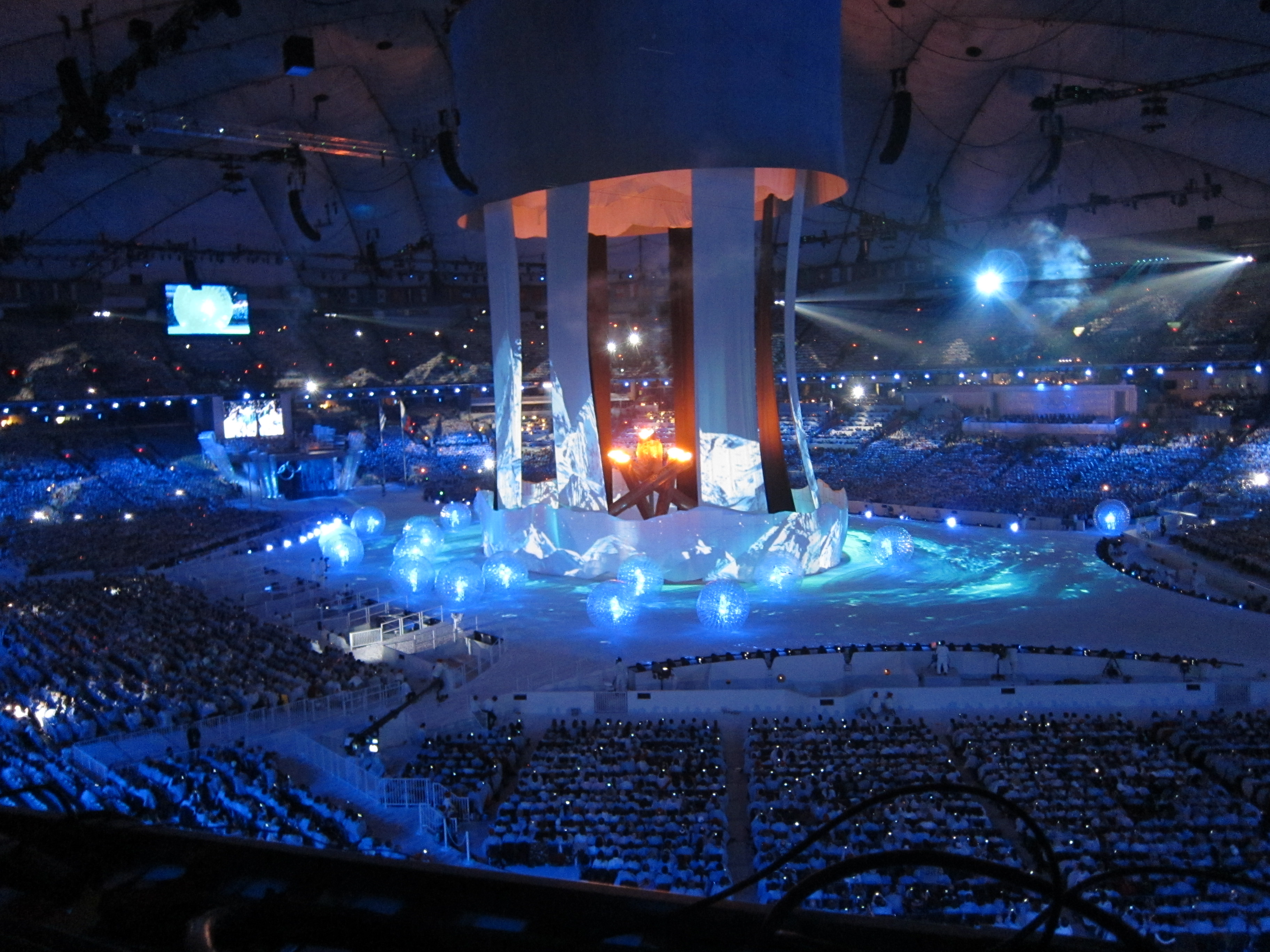
- Zorbs and view of mountains of Sochi during Russia's presentation of Sochi 2014 at the closing ceremony of the Vancouver 2010 Winter Olympics
- Date: February 28, 2010; 16 years ago
- Time: 17:30 – 20:00 PST (UTC−8)
- Venue: BC Place
- Location: Vancouver, British Columbia, Canada; 49°16′36″N 123°6′43″W
- Filmed by: Olympic Broadcasting Services (OBS)

The closing ceremony of the 2010 Winter Olympics took place on February 28, 2010, beginning at 5:30 pm PST (01:30 UTC, March 1) at BC Place Stadium in Vancouver, British Columbia, Canada. It was the first Olympic Closing Ceremony held in an indoor venue since the 1984 Winter Olympics in Sarajevo.

== Program ==
The production's director, David Atkins, previously directed the Sydney 2000 Olympic and the 2006 Doha Asian Games ceremonies. The choreographer for the finale was Jean Grand-Maître, artistic director of the Alberta Ballet.

=== Pre-ceremony activities ===
A joke was made about the hydraulic system failure with the indoor cauldron in the opening ceremony. Electrical sparks, a fake chicken and feathers shot out of the hole where the fourth arm would have risen. After this, Québécois clown and mime Yves Dagenais, dressed in workmen's clothing, climbed out of the hole, plugged two long cords together, and pretended to pull the fourth pillar out as it emerged. Dagenais then "summoned" Catriona Le May Doan (who appeared from underneath the stage via an elevated trap door), holding a lit torch in her hand. She looked around, acting bewildered, and then saw Dagenais, and he happily presented to her the emerging fourth pillar. He then wiped his brow with a red handkerchief to signify a job well done and walked off the stage. After the pillar was in place, Le May Doan, who had been left out of the lighting of the cauldron in the opening ceremony because of the failure, saluted the audience by holding her torch in the air, walked over toward the pillar and was finally able to light the cauldron, to great fanfare from the audience. With the entire cauldron lit, Le May Doan saluted the audience again and then descended back underneath the stage.

A mass of white-clad high school students with snowboards came out and surrounded the cauldron while the band Inward Eye gave a performance, with the Vancouver Youth Symphony Orchestra behind them. This took place during the countdown, which was followed by the release of fireworks in BC Place. After the countdown and fireworks, the anthem cast created the words Strong and Free followed by a maple leaf and then a circle surrounding the cauldron to welcome the official party.

Chief Leonard Andrew of the Lil'wat, Chief Ernie Campbell of the Musqueam, Chief Bill Williams of the Squamish, and Chief Justin George of the Tsleil-Waututh were welcomed. Stephen Harper, the Prime Minister of Canada and IOC president Jacques Rogge were then introduced.

=== National anthem ===
A bilingual rendition of the Canadian national anthem O Canada was sung by the Anthem Cast, The Vancouver Youth Symphony Orchestra, & Inward Eye.

=== Entrance of the flag bearers and the parade of the athletes ===
The flag bearers for the participating nations then entered the stadium at the same time, making a ring around the Olympic Cauldron. Following tradition, the athletes entered the stadium in no particular order to parade around the Olympic Cauldron at the centre of the stadium, before filing out to take their reserved front row seats.

=== Musical portion ===
Three musicians, Eva Avila, Nikki Yanofsky, and Derek Miller, each on an elevated, lighted column that rose out of the stadium floor, sang the song "Let's Have a Party" in French and English.

=== Medal ceremony ===
As with tradition, the medals to one of the marquee events of the Winter Games – men's 50 km classical cross-country – were presented during the closing ceremony. The race was held earlier that day in Whistler Olympic Park. The medals were given by Gerhard Heiberg, IOC member for Norway and member of the Executive Commission of the IOC. The flowers were given by the Ski Federation.

=== Recognitions ===
Two new members of the IOC, Angela Ruggiero (USA) and Adam Pengilly (UK), were announced. The volunteers who made the games possible were also recognized.

=== Greek national anthem ===
A Royal Canadian Mounted Police honour guard raised the Greek national flag while the Greek national anthem was then sung by Greek-Canadian opera singer Ariana Chris. This is the only time in any Olympic closing ceremony apart from the 2000 and 2004 Olympic Games that the Greek national anthem has been performed in this way, with most renditions of the anthem being instrumental recordings.

=== Olympic Hymn ===
Canadian operatic tenor Ben Heppner, born in British Columbia who performed the national anthem at the 2006 closing ceremony in Torino, then sang the Olympic Hymn, mixing English and French, while the RCMP honour guards lowered the Olympic flag. This flag was raised again in London on July 27, 2012 during the opening ceremonies of the 2012 Summer Olympics.

=== Handover of the Olympic flag ===
The Olympic flag was handed off by Gregor Robertson, the mayor of Vancouver, to Jacques Rogge, the president of the IOC. It was then handed off to the mayor of Sochi, Anatoly Pakhomov, whose city was set to host the 2014 Winter Olympics. The flag arrived in Sochi at the end of March and was raised at that city's municipal building until the 2014 games. During that time, the orchestra played an excerpt from the "Olympic Fanfare and Theme" by John Williams. The flag of Russia was then raised and the Russian national anthem was sung by the Moscow State Chamber Choir, conducted by Vladimir Minin.

=== Greetings from Sochi ===
A handover presentation was then staged to showcase the 2014 Winter Olympics in Sochi. The segment featured Russian supermodel Natalia Vodianova appearing in a special video, Maria Guleghina performing while riding on a special troika containing white neon horses, the principal dancers of the Kirov, Bolshoi and Mariinsky ballets making an appearance, 2006 Olympic champions Tatiana Navka and Roman Kostomarov ice dancing by the Black Sea, giant zorbs rolling around the stage, the appearance of figure skaters Evgeni Plushenko and Irina Rodnina with ice hockey players Alexander Ovechkin and Vladislav Tretiak (four years later, Rodnina and Tretiak would light the cauldron in Sochi), and—just like what happened 34 years before at the Montreal 1976 closing ceremony during the Moscow 1980 handover segment—a live orchestra performance playing in Red Square while being conducted (via satellite) by Valery Gergiev, who was inside BC Place.

=== Games declared closed ===
The games were formally closed by International Olympic Committee President Jacques Rogge calling them "excellent and very friendly" in his tradition of assigning each games their own identity in closing comments. Rogge also addressed the tragic loss of Georgian luger Nodar Kumaritashvili (who died in an accident at the Whistler Sliding Centre on February 12, 2010) in his comments, stating his condolences for the country of Georgia, and that his memory "will always be with us." John Furlong, chair of VANOC, also spoke.

Neil Young sang "Long May You Run" while the Olympic flame was extinguished in both the indoor and outdoor cauldrons. After both flames were extinguished, all four legs of the indoor cauldron descended to the ground.

== Cultural section ==
William Shatner, Michael J. Fox and Catherine O'Hara came onto the stadium floor and delivered comedic monologues playing on stereotypes of Canadians. O'Hara's section involved the tendency of Canadians to be overly polite and apologetic. Shatner's section involved beer. Fox's section involved urban areas and terrain.

The theme of satirizing Canadian clichés continued with Michael Bublé dressed as a Mountie performing "The Maple Leaf Forever" first straight, followed by four scantily clad singer/dancers dressed as Mounties stripping his Mountie uniform to reveal a tuxedo leading to a whimsical Vegas-style arrangement of the song as a procession of giant Mounties, dancing Mounties, hockey players, giant table hockey players wearing gold medals (as Canada won both the men's and women's tournaments), complete with a child dressed as a puck for said game, followed by voyageurs and lumberjacks in dancing canoes, bare-midriff dancing and ceiling hung maple leaves, and last but not least, several giant inflatable beavers and flying moose. "The Maple Leaf Forever" was sung using a modern version rather than its traditional lyrics and was arranged in a medley with other pieces. Hockey Night in Canada's former, but still iconic, signature tune, "The Hockey Theme", was played during the giant-sized hockey match. The entrance of the voyageurs was accompanied by the traditional French-Canadian song "Envoyons d'l'avant nos gens" performed by La Bottine Souriante, while the cultural section ended with Bublé singing the last line of "O Canada". Audience members were provided with and encouraged to wear headgear fashioned into moose antlers.

== Concert section ==
- Nickelback opened the concert section with "Burn It to the Ground".
- Avril Lavigne, who performed "Who Knows" during the closing ceremony of the Torino Olympics, performed "My Happy Ending" and "Girlfriend" afterwards.
- Alanis Morissette performed "Wunderkind".
- Simple Plan performed "Your Love Is a Lie"
- Hedley performed "Cha-Ching"
- Marie-Mai performed "Emmène-moi" (Take me along)
- k-os performed "Eye Know Something" with various Vancouver-area hip-hop dancers, including members of Now or Never Crew, Xtreme Soul Style, Freshh, and Style-O-Phonics.
- Invented instrument ensemble Scrap Arts Music performed an abridged version of "Phonk" in the closing minutes of the concert section.

== Notable attendees ==
Aside from celebrities participating in the ceremony, mayors Robertson and Pakhomov, and members of the International Olympic Committee, the following notable people were in attendance:

- Michaëlle Jean, Governor General of Canada
- Stephen Harper, Prime Minister of Canada
- Gordon Campbell, Premier of British Columbia
- Chief Leonard Andrew of the Lil'wat Nation
- Chief Ernie Campbell of the Musqueam Indian Band,
- Chief Bill Williams of the Squamish Nation
- Chief Justin George of the Tsleil-Waututh First Nation
- Janet Napolitano, U.S. Secretary of Homeland Security
- Kathleen Sebelius, U.S. Secretary of Health and Human Services

The Canadian TV network CTV claimed that traditionally a senior government representative of the country hosting the next Winter Olympics is also present during the closing ceremony, but neither Russian President Dmitry Medvedev nor Prime Minister Vladimir Putin attended. CTV speculated that this was due to domestic discontent over their nation's performance in Vancouver. In comparison, Canada's Governor General Michaëlle Jean had attended the Torino Olympics closing ceremony.

== Anthems ==
- National Anthem of Canada – Inward Eye
- National Anthem of Greece – Ariana Chris
- (International Olympic Committee) Olympic Hymn – Ben Heppner
- (Russia) Russian National Anthem – Moscow State Chamber Choir conducted by Vladimir Minin

=== Victory ceremonies ===
- National Anthem of Norway (Note: Anthem played as part of the Men's 50km mass start classical victory ceremony.)

== Television broadcast ==
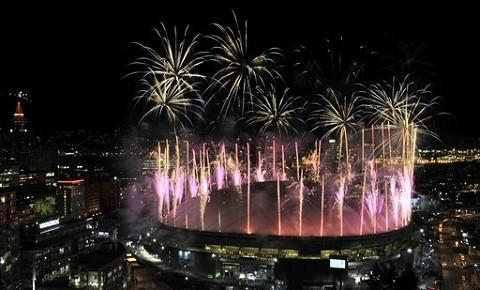
Fireworks over BC Place during the closing ceremony

In Australia coverage was carried on the Nine Network and Foxtel.

In Canada, CTV, Omni Television, Rogers Sportsnet, TSN, RDS and V broadcast the ceremony live. However, there were lengthy commercial breaks during the broadcast, one of which excluded the entrance of the Canadian athletes when returning live. Furthermore, the Canadian broadcast also omitted the men's 50 km classical cross-country medal ceremony and the subsequent Norwegian national anthem. The broadcast was the second-most watched event in Canadian television history, with an estimated 24.5 million people watching some part of the ceremonies (of a population of ~ 34 million).

In China, CCTV-1 and CCTV-5 broadcast the ceremony.

In Brazil, only Sportv broadcast the ceremony live. Rede Record and Record News broadcast the ceremony 90 minutes after its conclusion, in order not to interfere with its prime-time schedule.

In Germany, ZDF carried the closing ceremony. Because of the time difference, it was 3:30 clock in the morning.

In Hong Kong, Cable TV Hong Kong broadcast the closing ceremony.

In Mexico, XEIMT-TV Canal 22 broadcast the ceremony live.

In Norway, NRK broadcast the ceremony live.

In Russia, Russia 1 broadcast the ceremony live.

In the UK, the BBC and British Eurosport broadcast the closing ceremony.

In the United States, NBC broadcast the closing ceremony with coverage starting at 7:00 pm EST. NBC abruptly ended Olympic coverage at 10:30 pm EST, to broadcast the debut of The Marriage Ref, and resumed at 11:35 pm EST after late local news. This spawned outbursts from upset viewers, especially on Twitter.

== Soundtrack ==
Sounds of Vancouver 2010: Closing Ceremony Commemorative Album

Soundtrack album by Various artists
- Released: March 1, 2010
- Genres: Pop, rock
- Length: 67:57
- Label: EMI Music Canada
- Producer: David Atkins

2010 Winter Olympics chronology
Sounds of Vancouver 2010: Opening Ceremony Commemorative Album (2010)	Sounds of Vancouver 2010: Closing Ceremony Commemorative Album (2010)

Sounds of Vancouver 2010: Closing Ceremony Commemorative Album (French: Musique de Vancouver 2010 : L'album commémoratif de la cérémonie de clôture des Jeux), the soundtrack for the closing ceremony, was released on the iTunes Store on March 1, 2010. It charted at #17 on the Canadian Albums Chart. "Un peu plus haut, un peu plus loin", performed by Garou is the only track from the opening ceremony included.

No.	Title	Artist	Length
1.	"Closing Ceremony Fanfare"	The 2010 Vancouver Olympic Orchestra	0:26
2.	"Strong & Free"	The Cast of Closing Ceremonies of the 2010 Vancouver Olympic Games & The Vancouver Youth Symphony Orchestra	2:37
3.	"O Canada (With Glowing Hearts)"	The Vancouver Youth Symphony Orchestra & Inward Eye	2:18
4.	"Olympic Fanfare and Theme"	Massed Orchestras of the 2010 Vancouver Olympic Winter Games	4:17
5.	"Entrance of the Athletes of the 2010 Olympic Winter Games"	Massed Orchestras of the 2010 Vancouver Olympic Winter Games	3:22
6.	"Let's Have a Party"	Derek Miller, Eva Avila & Nikki Yanofsky	3:17
7.	"Greek National Anthem"	The Vancouver Youth Symphony Orchestra & Ariana Chris	1:58
8.	"Olympic Anthem"	Ben Heppner & The Vancouver Youth Symphony Orchestra	3:24
9.	"Long May You Run"	Neil Young	3:57
10.	"The Maple Leaf Forever"	Michael Bublé	3:05
11.	"Made in Canada"	La Bottine Souriante & The Vancouver 2010 Swing Orchestra	7:18
12.	"Burn It to the Ground"	Nickelback	3:29
13.	"Girlfriend" (Radio Edit)	Avril Lavigne	3:36
14.	"Emmène-moi"	Marie-Mai	3:25
15.	"Cha-Ching"	Hedley	3:29
16.	"Your Love Is a Lie"	Simple Plan	3:40
17.	"Wunderkind"	Alanis Morissette	5:16
18.	"Eye Know Something"	k-os	3:40
19.	"Un peu plus haut, un peu plus loin"	Garou	5:23

Chart (2010)	Peak position
Canadian Albums Chart	17

== See also ==
- 2010 Winter Olympics opening ceremony
- 2006 Winter Olympics closing ceremony
- 2014 Winter Olympics opening ceremony
- 2014 Winter Olympics closing ceremony
