= Scrap Arts Music =

Musical ensemble based in British Columbia, Canada

Scrap Arts Music is a percussion-based, performing arts company headquartered in British Columbia, Canada, founded by Canadian artists, Gregory Kozak and Justine Murdy, in Vancouver, in July 1998. Scrap Arts Music creates original instruments and musical compositions; produces original sound and video recordings; and creates choreographed athletic performances for theatres, festivals, schools, orchestras, and special events.

Scrap Arts Music (a.k.a. ScrapArtsMusic) is also the name of the company's touring percussion quintet. Scrap Arts Music performs internationally, playing original compositions by Gregory Kozak on invented instruments made from industrial scraps.

== History ==
In 1998, composer and percussionist Gregory Kozak and designer Justine Murdy co-founded Scrap Arts Music in Vancouver Canada. Kozak wanted to build his own "orchestra of invented instruments" and Murdy thought they could use salvaged and recycled materials from their home town. Many folk instruments are handmade from local materials; this is reported to have inspired them. During the late 90s, there was a condominium tower boom in Vancouver. Because of this, large amounts of construction byproduct and marine salvage were being discarded in landfills. Kozak collected scraps from fabrication shops and construction sites and created a collection of musical instruments from these scraps. Each instrument is original, mobile, and tuneable, and claimed to be distinct to the west coast of Canada.

Scrap Arts Music makes their instruments by upcycling industrial scraps and welding them into sculptural instruments. Materials used include spun aluminum, steel railings, submarine parts, artillery shells, old accordions, and marine exhaust hose. More recently, old street lamp shades and pulp mill parts have been incorporated into new instruments.

Kozak learned the skills of welding and metal fabrication in order to create instruments. He has now built over 200 instruments from West Coast scraps that are both sculptural and mobile. Kozak composes original music to be played on these instruments by a quintet of percussionist/multi-instrumentalists. Athletic choreography is an integral feature of live performances. Scrap Arts Music gives expression to the energy and excitement of percussion-based music.

Scrap Arts Music was in residency at the Banff Centre for three months in 2001 and debuted in the United States later that year, at the Philadelphia Fringe Festival. In 2002, they released the album, Phon, with nine original tracks. Also in 2002, Scrap Arts Music was nominated for a West Coast Music Award in the category of Best Live Performance. They have played for international audiences for two decades. Scrap Arts Music performs a variety of events, including concerts, educational shows, corporate events, and holiday events.

In 2016, Scrap Arts Music relocated their studio from Vancouver to Victoria, British Columbia.

Scrap Arts Music's percussion-based performances have been compared to Blue Man Group, STOMP, Partch Ensemble, Kodo Drummers of Japan, and Cirque du Soleil. Scrap Arts Music is currently represented by Rhythm of the Arts out of New York.

Scrap Arts Music performed at the 2010 Winter Olympics Closing Ceremony, as well as the first Medals Ceremony of the 2010 Winter Olympics, February 2010. They are now touring their production of Children of Metropolis.

== Founders ==
=== Gregory Kozak ===
Gregory Kozak is the Artistic Director of Scrap Arts Music. Before Scrap Arts Music, Gregory co-founded and performed in S•W•A•R•M (Symphonic Work Assembly of Rhythm and Movement) from 1995–1998. Kozak composes music, creates invented instruments, and choreographs movement. He is an ensemble musician and a concert soloist. He has a background in jazz and world music. The five-member touring ensemble, Scrap Arts Music, plays Kozak's 145-plus invented instruments and his original repertoire at international festivals and theatres.

=== Justine Murdy ===
Justine Murdy is Co-Artistic Director and co-founder of Scrap Arts Music. Murdy is involved in project conceptualization, instrument design, art direction, stage direction, music critique, and future projects.

== Themes ==
Scrap Arts Music has an eco-friendly message. They take industrial scraps and create instruments; and then create musical performances. Scrap Arts Music's style is culturally referenced.

Scrap Arts Music's performances are family-friendly and not age-specific. The company is also committed to providing community outreach activities. Gregory Kozak has led workshops on sound, drums, and instruments for various organizations.

=== Discography ===
Phon (2003) - Scrap Arts Music's first album, with nine original tracks.

=== Videography ===
ReVision (2011) - ReVision features the art of Pacific Northwest artists such as Ross Palmer Beecher, Marita Dingus, and Scrap Arts Music who create music, sculpture, fashion, street, and mixed media art using re-purposed, found, or salvaged materials. The medium used by these artists has an environmental message about consumption and waste issues. ReVision is a consideration of the issues recycled artists face in trying to get their messages out in a traditional art world.

== See also ==
- Blue Man Group
- STOMP
