= Long May You Run (song) =

- Belgian 7" vinyl single cover

Single by The Stills-Young Band

from the album Long May You Run
- B-side: "12/8 Blues (All the Same)"
- Released: 1976
- Recorded: February 5, 1976
- Studio: Criteria Studio, Miami, Florida
- Length: 3:55
- Label: Reprise
- Songwriter: Neil Young
- Producers: Don Gehman; Stephen Stills; Neil Young

The Stills-Young Band singles chronology
"Long May You Run" (1976)	"Midnight on the Bay" (1976)

"Long May You Run" is a song written and performed by Canadian rock artist Neil Young. It was released for the first time on the eponymous 1976 album credited to the Stills-Young Band, a collaboration between Young and Stephen Stills, and was released as a single but failed to chart. The song saw a single release again in 1993 as a live version from the album Neil Young Unplugged, and reached No. 28 in Canada and No. 34 on the US Mainstream Rock chart, while in the UK it reached No. 71.

== History and meaning ==
Young's 1948 Buick Roadmaster hearse "Mort" (a.k.a. "Mortimer Hearseburg") was the inspiration for the song. In 1976, Stills and Young formed the Stills-Young Band and released the album Long May You Run. During the short-lived collaboration, the two wrote separately for the album, with Stills adding four songs and Young adding five, including the title track. Young also chose the song for his 1976 compilation Decade, and performed this song at the closing ceremonies of the 2010 Vancouver Winter Olympic Games, to an ovation of Canadian audience members.

== Charts ==
- Billboard Mainstream Rock - 34
- Canada - 28
- UK - 71
