= Chile =

Country in South America

Republic of Chile República de Chile (Spanish)
- Flag Coat of arms
- Motto: Por la razón o la fuerza ("By reason or by force")
- Anthem: Himno Nacional de Chile ("National Anthem of Chile")
- Chilean territory in dark green; claimed but uncontrolled territory in light green
- Capital and largest city: Santiago (Note: Legislature is based in Valparaíso.); 33°26′S 70°40′W
- National language: Spanish
- Other spoken languages: Aymara; Kawésqar; Mapudungun; Quechua; Rapa Nui
- Religion (2024): 73.1% Christianity; 54.0% Catholic; 16.3% Protestant; 2.8% other Christians; 25.8% no religion; 0.2% Judaism; 0.1% Buddhism; 0.1% Islam; 0.7% other religions
- Demonym: Chilean
- Government: Unitary presidential republic
  - President: José Antonio Kast
  - President of the Senate: Paulina Núñez
  - President of the Chamber of Deputies: Jorge Alessandri
  - President of Supreme Court: Gloria Ana Chevesich
- Legislature: National Congress
  - Upper house: Senate
  - Lower house: Chamber of Deputies

Independence from Spain
  - Government Junta: 18 September 1810
  - Declared: 12 February 1818
  - Recognized: 25 April 1844
  - Current constitution: 11 March 1981

Area
  - Total: 756,101.96 km^{2} (291,932.60 sq mi) (Note: Includes Easter Island and Isla Salas y Gómez; does not include 1,250,000 square kilometres (480,000 sq mi) of territory claimed in Antarctica.) (37th)
  - Water (%): 2.1 (as of 2015)

Population
  - 2023 estimate: ▲19,629,588 (63rd)
  - 2024 census: 18,480,432
  - Density: 24/km^{2} (62.2/sq mi) (198th)
- GDP (PPP): 2026 estimate
  - Total: ▲$745.751 billion (43rd)
  - Per capita: ▲$37,008 (64th)
- GDP (nominal): 2026 estimate
  - Total: ▲$402.243 billion (43rd)
  - Per capita: ▲$19,961 (64th)
- Gini (2024): ▼43.0 medium inequality
- HDI (2023): ▲0.878 very high (45th)
- Currency: Chilean peso (CLP)
- Time zone: UTC−3, −4, −6 (CLST, CLT, EAST)
  - Summer (DST): UTC−3, −5 (CLST, EASST)
- Magallanes and the Chilean Antarctica, and Aysén Region observes UTC−3 year-round.
- Date format: dd/mm/yyyy
- Calling code: +56
- ISO 3166 code: CL
- Internet TLD: .cl

Chile, (Note: English: /ˈtʃɪli/ CHIL-ee or /ˈtʃileɪ/ CHEE-lay, Spanish: [ˈtʃile] (Note: In Chilean Spanish, pronunciation ranges from [ˈʃile] ~ [ˈt͡ʃiːle] on a spectrum from lower to upper classes, respectively, the former being a somewhat-stigmatized basilect. See the "Sample" section for an IPA-transcribed text in a lower-class form of the dialect.)) officially the Republic of Chile, (Note: Spanish: República de Chile [reˈpuβlika ðe ˈtʃile]) is a country in the Southern Cone of southwestern South America. It is the southernmost country in the world and the closest to Antarctica, extending along a narrow strip of land between the Andes Mountains and the Pacific Ocean. According to the 2024 census, Chile had an enumerated population of 18.5 million. The country covers a territorial area of 756,102 square kilometers (291,933 sq mi), sharing borders with Peru to the north, Bolivia to the northeast, Argentina to the east, and the Drake Passage to the south. It also administers several Pacific islands, including Juan Fernández, Isla Salas y Gómez, Desventuradas, and Easter Island, and claims about 1,250,000 square kilometers (480,000 sq mi) of Antarctica as the Chilean Antarctic Territory. (Note: Since 1961, all claims to Antarctic land are de jure suspended under the Antarctic Treaty System.) The capital and largest city is Santiago, and the official and national language is Spanish.

Spain conquered and colonized the region in the mid-16th century, replacing Inca rule; however, they failed to conquer the autonomous tribal Mapuche people who inhabited what is now south-central Chile. Chile emerged as a relatively stable authoritarian republic in the 1830s after its 1818 declaration of independence from Spain. During the 19th century, Chile experienced significant economic and territorial growth, putting an end to Mapuche resistance in the 1880s and gaining its current northern territory in the War of the Pacific (1879–83) by defeating Peru and Bolivia.

In the 20th century, until the 1970s, Chile underwent a process of democratization and experienced rapid population growth and urbanization, while relying increasingly on exports from copper mining to support its economy. During the 1960s and 1970s, the country was marked by severe left-right political polarization and turmoil, which culminated in the 11 September 1973 coup d'état, with support from the United States, that overthrew Salvador Allende's democratically elected left-wing government. This was followed by a 16-and-a-half-year right-wing military dictatorship led by Augusto Pinochet, during which the 1980 Constitution was enacted, along with numerous political and economic reforms, and which was marked by widespread human rights violations, including more than 3,000 deaths and disappearances. After the coup d'état, an armed leftist resistance movement against Augusto Pinochet's dictatorship developed until the regime ended in 1990, following a referendum in 1988, and was succeeded by a center-left coalition, which ruled until 2010.

Chile is a high-income economy and is one of the most economically and socially stable nations in South America. Chile also performs well in the region in terms of sustainability of the state and democratic development. Chile is a founding member of the United Nations, the Community of Latin American and Caribbean States (CELAC), and the Pacific Alliance, and joined the OECD in 2010.

== Etymology ==
There are various theories about the origin of the word Chile. According to 17th-century Spanish chronicler Diego de Rosales, the Incas called the valley of the Aconcagua Chili by corruption of the name of a Picunche tribal chief (cacique) called Tili, who ruled the area at the time of the Incan conquest in the 15th century. Another theory points to the similarity of the valley of the Aconcagua with that of the Casma Valley in Peru, where there was a town and valley named Chili.

Other theories say Chile may derive its name from a Native American word meaning either 'ends of the earth' or 'sea gulls'; from the Mapuche word chilli, which may mean 'where the land ends'" or from the Quechua chiri, 'cold', or tchili, meaning either 'snow' or "the deepest point of the Earth". Another origin attributed to chilli is the onomatopoeic cheele-cheele—the Mapuche imitation of the warble of a bird locally known as trile.

The Spanish conquistadors heard about this name from the Incas, and the few survivors of Diego de Almagro's first Spanish expedition south from Peru in 1535–36 called themselves the "men of Chilli". Ultimately, Almagro is credited with the universalization of the name Chile, after naming the Mapocho valley as such. The older spelling "Chili" was in use in English until the early 20th century before switching to "Chile".

== History ==
=== Early history ===
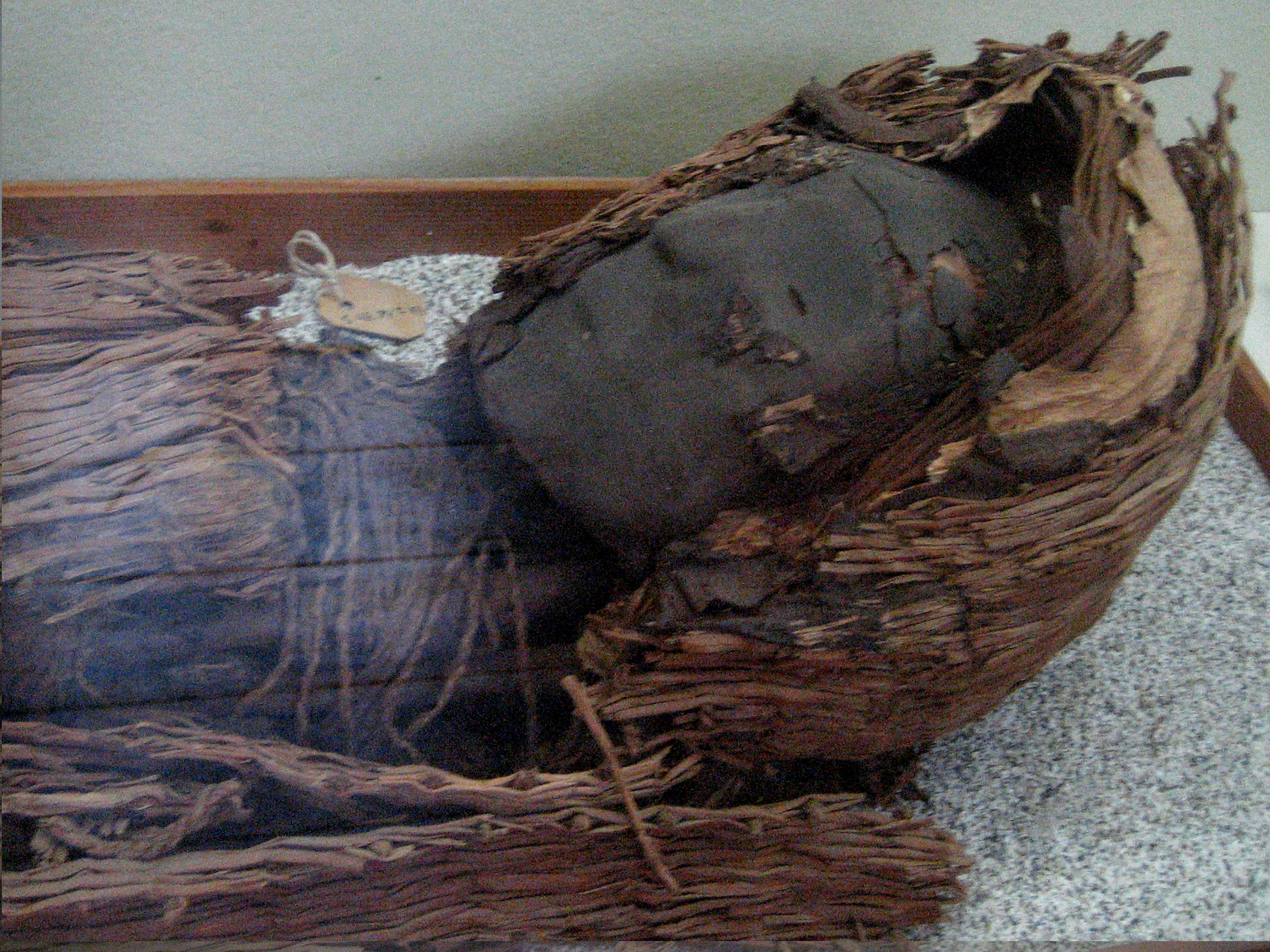
The Chinchorro mummies, the oldest of which are from around 5050 BCE

Stone tool evidence indicates humans sporadically frequented the Monte Verde valley area as far back as 18,500 years ago. About 10,000 years ago, migrating Indigenous peoples settled in fertile valleys and coastal areas of what is present-day Chile. Settlement sites from very early human habitation include Monte Verde, Cueva del Milodón and the Pali-Aike Crater's lava tube.

The Incas briefly extended their empire into what is now northern Chile, but the Mapuche (or "Araucanians", as they were known by the Spaniards) successfully resisted many attempts by the Inca Empire to subjugate them, despite their lack of state organization, fighting against the Sapa Inca Topa Inca Yupanqui and his army; the result of the bloody three-day Battle of the Maule was that the Inca conquest of Chilean territory ended at the Maule river.

=== Mapuche ===
The Mapuche are the largest Indigenous group in South America, with a population of nearly two million, primarily residing in the Central Valley of Chile, with a smaller population in Argentina. They were referred to by Spanish colonizers as Araucanians and historically they were considered one of the three main groups, the Picunche, the Mapuche, and the Huiliche, which today all identify as Mapuche. Before European contact, Mapuche society consisted mainly of scattered farming villages which were primarily led by a chief whose authority was limited to his own village. The Mapuche are notable for their long and determined resistance to foreign domination resisting both the Incan empire and Spanish colonial forces. During the 16th century, the Mapuche reorganized made alliances, and formed a resistance against the Spanish and later Chilean expansion. They maintained a level of autonomy until the late 19th century when Chile subdued their territory. Despite colonization and loss, the Mapuche have retained many aspects of their culture, identity, and tradition to this day.

=== Spanish colonization ===
Spain's Kingdom of Chile in 1810 highlighting the historiographical disputes surrounding it, as well as the Araucanía, a territory under indigenous self-government that belongs to Chile. In 1776 the Viceroyalty of the Río de la Plata was created and the territories of the cities of Mendoza and San Juan got transferred to the new entity.

In 1520, while attempting to circumnavigate the globe, Ferdinand Magellan discovered the southern passage now named after him (the Strait of Magellan) thus becoming the first European to set foot on what is now Chile. The next Europeans to reach Chile were Diego de Almagro and his band of Spanish conquistadors, who came from Peru in 1535 seeking gold. The Spanish encountered various cultures that supported themselves principally through slash-and-burn agriculture and hunting.

The conquest of Chile began in earnest in 1540 and was carried out by Pedro de Valdivia, one of Francisco Pizarro's lieutenants, who founded the city of Santiago on 12 February 1541. Although the Spanish did not find the extensive gold and silver they sought, they recognized the agricultural potential of Chile's central valley, and Chile became part of the Spanish Empire.

Conquest took place gradually, and the Europeans suffered repeated setbacks. A massive Mapuche insurrection that began in 1553 resulted in Valdivia's death and the destruction of many of the colony's principal settlements. Subsequent major insurrections took place in 1598 and in 1655. Each time the Mapuche and other native groups revolted, the southern border of the colony was driven northward. The abolition of slavery by the Spanish crown in 1683 was done in recognition that enslaving the Mapuche intensified resistance rather than cowing them into submission. Despite royal prohibitions, relations remained strained from continual colonialist interference.

Cut off to the north by desert, to the south by the Mapuche, to the east by the Andes Mountains, and to the west by the ocean, Chile became one of the most centralized, homogeneous territories in Spanish America. Serving as a sort of frontier garrison, the colony found itself with the mission of forestalling encroachment by both the Mapuche and Spain's European enemies, especially the English and the Dutch. Buccaneers and pirates menaced the colony in addition to the Mapuche, as was shown by Sir Francis Drake's 1578 raid on Valparaíso, the colony's principal port. Chile hosted one of the largest standing armies in the Americas, making it one of the most militarized of the Spanish possessions, as well as a drain on the treasury of the Viceroyalty of Peru.

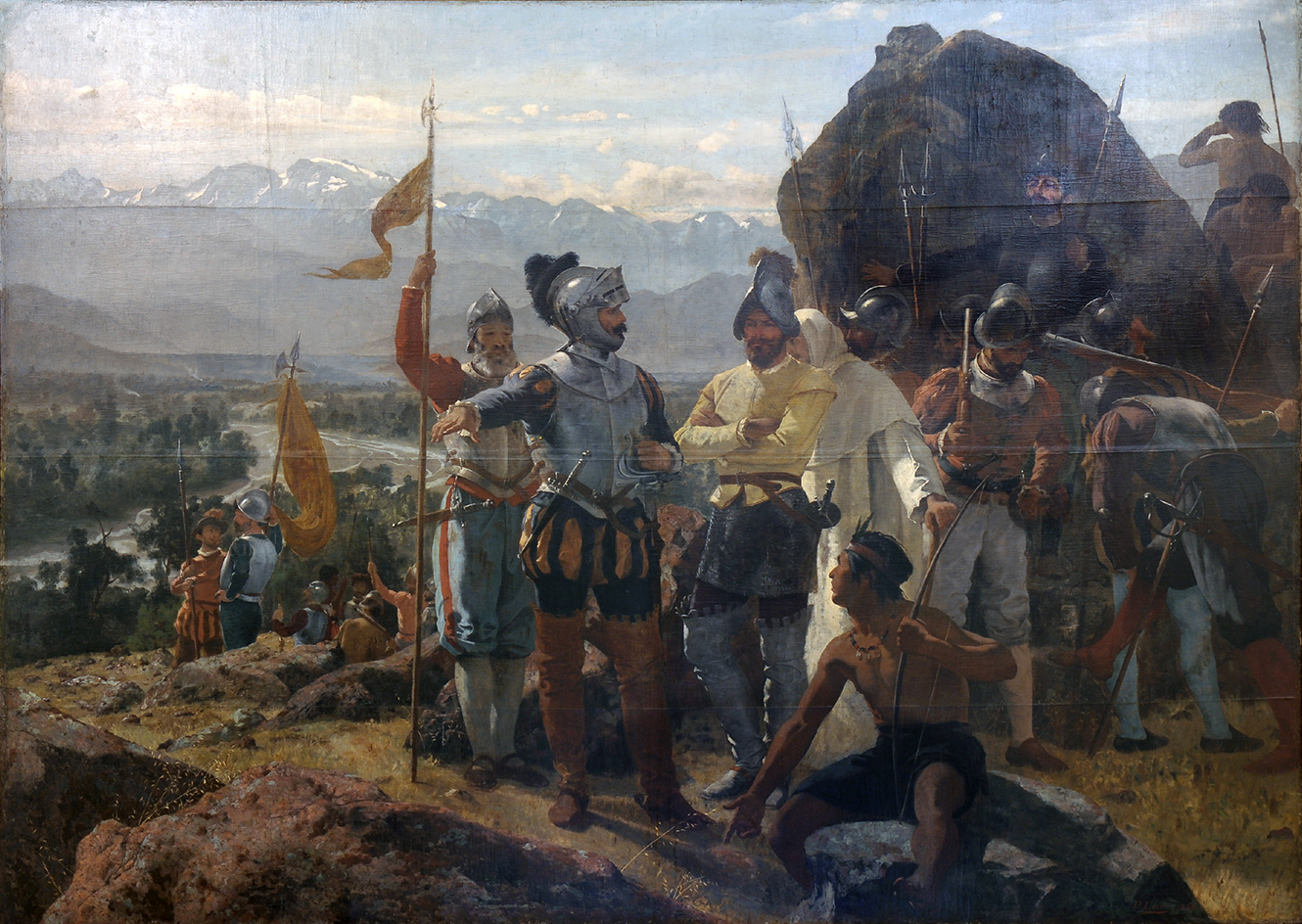
Pedro Lira's 1888 painting of the founding of Santiago by Pedro de Valdivia at Huelén Hill

The first general census was conducted by the government of Agustín de Jáuregui between 1777 and 1778; it indicated that the population consisted of 259,646 inhabitants: 73.5% of European descent, 7.9% mestizos, 8.6% indigenous peoples and 9.8% blacks. Francisco Hurtado, Governor of the province of Chiloé, conducted a census in 1784 and found the population consisted of 26,703 inhabitants, 64.4% of whom were whites and 33.5% of whom were natives. The Diocese of Concepción conducted a census in areas south of the Maule river in 1812, but did not include the indigenous population or the inhabitants of the province of Chiloé. The population was estimated at 210,567, 86.1% of whom were Spanish or of European descent, 10% of whom were indigenous and 3.7% of whom were mestizos, blacks and mulattos.

A 2021 study by Baten and Llorca-Jaña shows that regions with a relatively high share of North European migrants developed faster in terms of numeracy, even if the overall number of migrants was small. This effect might be related to externalities: the surrounding population adopted a similar behavior as the small non-European immigrant group, and new schools were created. Ironically, there might have been positive spillover effects from the educational investment made by migrants, at the same time numeracy might have been reduced by the greater inequality in these regions. However, the positive effects of immigration were apparently stronger.

=== Independence and nation building ===
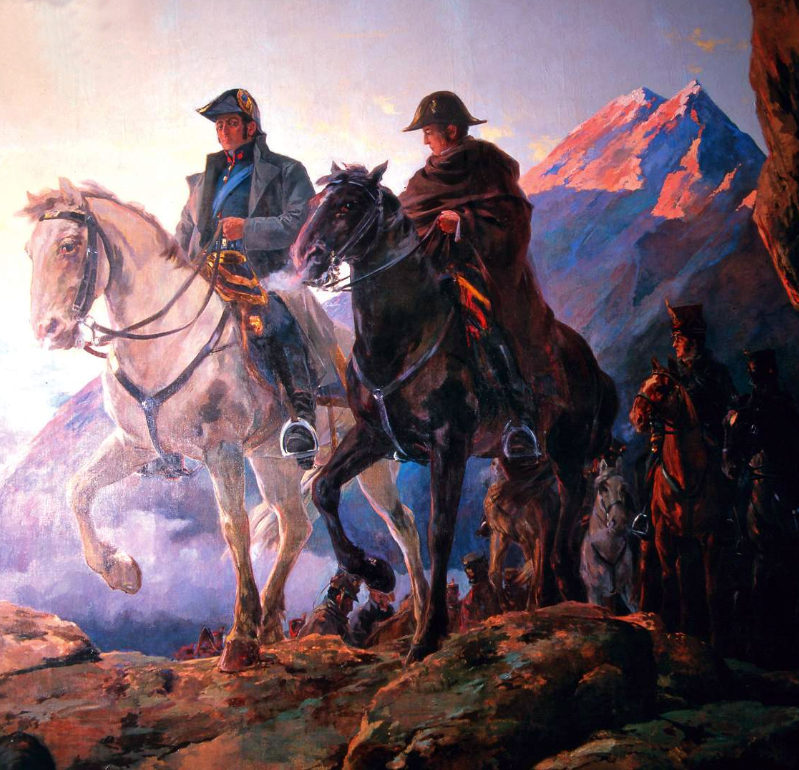
Generals José de San Martín (left) and Bernardo O'Higgins (right) during the crossing of the Andes

In 1808, Napoleon's enthronement of his brother Joseph as the Spanish King precipitated the drive by Chile for independence from Spain. A national junta in the name of Ferdinand – heir to the deposed king – was formed on 18 September 1810. The Government Junta of Chile proclaimed an autonomous government for Chile within the Spanish monarchy (in memory of this day, Chile celebrates its National Day on 18 September each year).

After these events, a movement for total independence, under the command of José Miguel Carrera (one of the most renowned patriots) and his two brothers Juan José and Luis Carrera, soon gained a wider following. Spanish attempts to re-impose arbitrary rule during what was called the Reconquista led to a prolonged struggle, including infighting from Bernardo O'Higgins, who challenged Carrera's leadership.

Intermittent warfare continued until 1817. With Carrera in prison in Argentina, O'Higgins and anti-Carrera cohort José de San Martín, hero of the Argentine War of Independence, led an army that crossed the Andes into Chile and defeated the royalists. On 12 February 1818, Chile was proclaimed an independent republic. The political revolt brought little social change, however, and 19th-century Chilean society preserved the essence of the stratified colonial social structure, which was greatly influenced by family politics and the Roman Catholic Church. A strong presidency eventually emerged, but wealthy landowners remained powerful. Bernardo O'Higgins once planned to expand Chile by liberating the Philippines from Spain and incorporating the islands. In this regard he tasked the Scottish naval officer, Lord Thomas Cochrane, in a letter dated 12 November 1821, expressing his plan to conquer Guayaquil, the Galapagos Islands, and the Philippines. There were preparations, but the plan did not push through because O'Higgins was exiled.

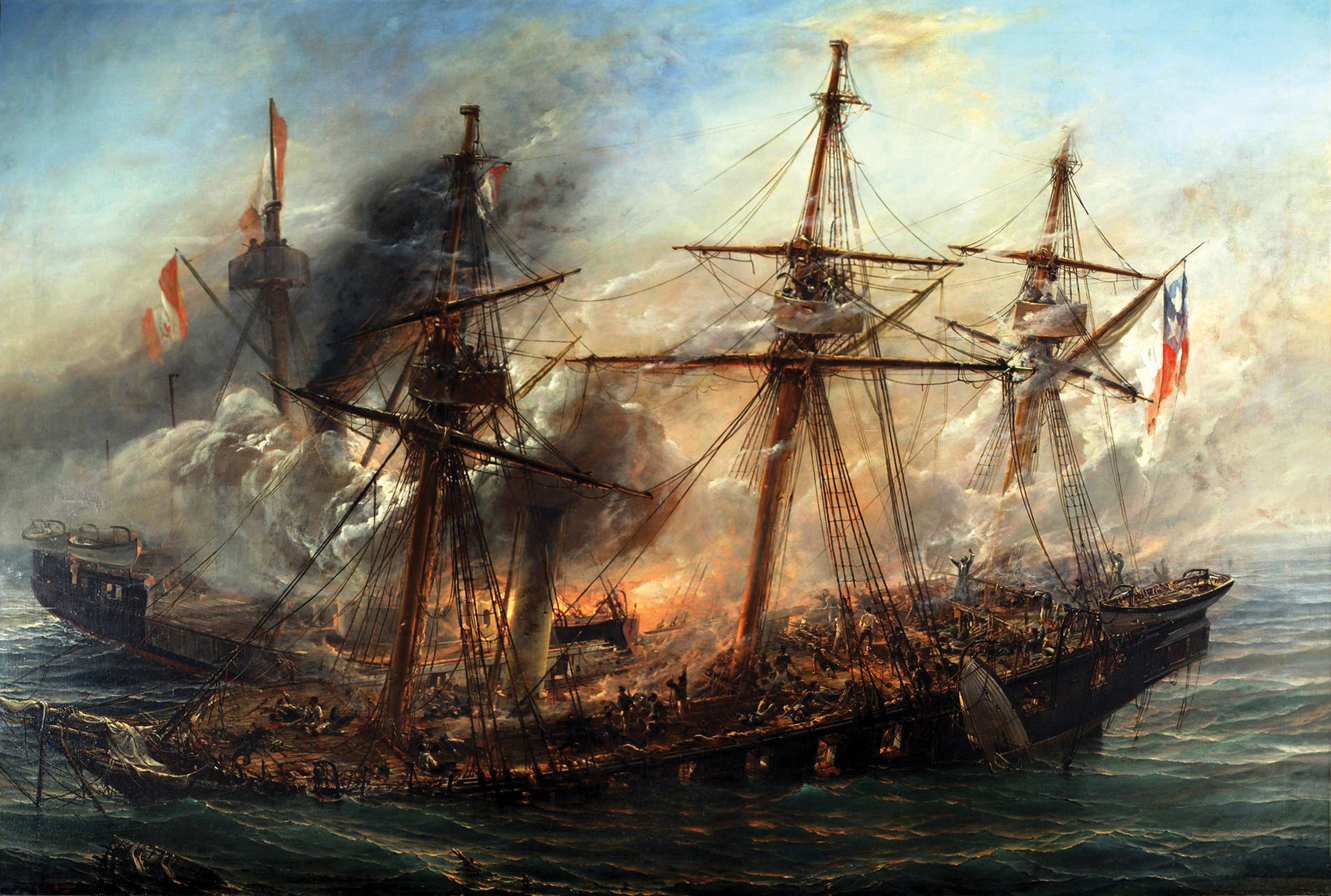
The Battle of Iquique on 21 May 1879. The victory of Chile in the War of the Pacific allowed its expansion into new territories.

Chile slowly started to expand its influence and to establish its borders. By the Tantauco Treaty, the archipelago of Chiloé was incorporated in 1826. The economy began to boom due to the discovery of silver ore in Chañarcillo, and the growing trade of the port of Valparaíso, which led to conflict with Peru over maritime supremacy in the Pacific. At the same time, attempts were made to strengthen sovereignty in southern Chile intensifying penetration into Araucanía and colonizing Llanquihue with German immigrants in 1848. Through the founding of Fort Bulnes by the Schooner Ancud under the command of John Williams Wilson, the Magallanes Region started to be controlled by country in 1843, while the Antofagasta Region, at the time in dispute with Bolivia, began to fill with people.

After the Chilean Civil War of 1829–1830 in which the conservatives won, under the Joaquín Prieto Administration, the Chilean Constitution of 1833 was written and put into effect with high influence from the triple minister Diego Portales. Two other civil wars happened in Chile in the 1850s, one in 1851 and the other one in 1859.

Territorial losses of the Republic of Chile de jure (by law) according to Chilean historiography

Toward the end of the 19th century, the government in Santiago consolidated its position in the south by the Occupation of Araucanía. The Boundary treaty of 1881 between Chile and Argentina confirmed Chilean sovereignty over the Strait of Magellan but also made the country renounce its claims in the rest of East Patagonia after a dispute that started in 1842. As a result of the War of the Pacific with Peru and Bolivia (1879–83), Chile expanded its territory northward by almost one-third, eliminating Bolivia's access to the Pacific, and acquired valuable nitrate deposits, the exploitation of which led to an era of national affluence. Chile had joined the stand as one of the high-income countries in South America by 1870.

On 9 September 1888, Chile took possession of Easter Island by the signing of a mutual will agreement with the local king, thanks to the efforts of the Bishop of Tahiti, Monsignor José María Verdier since the island was constantly attacked by slave merchants. The naval officer Policarpo Toro represented the Chilean Government and Atamu Tekena was the head of the Council of Rapanui. The Rapa Nui elders ceded sovereignty, without renouncing their titles as chiefs, the ownership of their lands, the validity of their culture and traditions on equal terms. The Rapa Nui sold nothing and were integrated in equal conditions into Chile.

The 1891 Chilean Civil War brought about a redistribution of power between the President and Congress, and Chile established a parliamentary style democracy. However, the Civil War had also been a contest between those who favored the development of local industries and powerful Chilean banking interests, particularly the House of Edwards which had strong ties to foreign investors. Soon after, the country engaged in a vastly expensive naval arms race with Argentina amid escalating geopolitical competition and the Puna de Atacama dispute.

The War of the Pacific (1879–1883) against Peru and Bolivia resulted in Chile annexing resource-rich territory from both countries and further consolidating its status as a regional power. It subsequently emerged as a leading naval power in the Americas, even sending a ship to protest United States involvement in the Panama crisis of 1885. Chile potentially threatened U.S. hegemony in the Western Hemisphere, with the two countries almost going to war during the Baltimore crisis in 1891.

=== 20th century ===
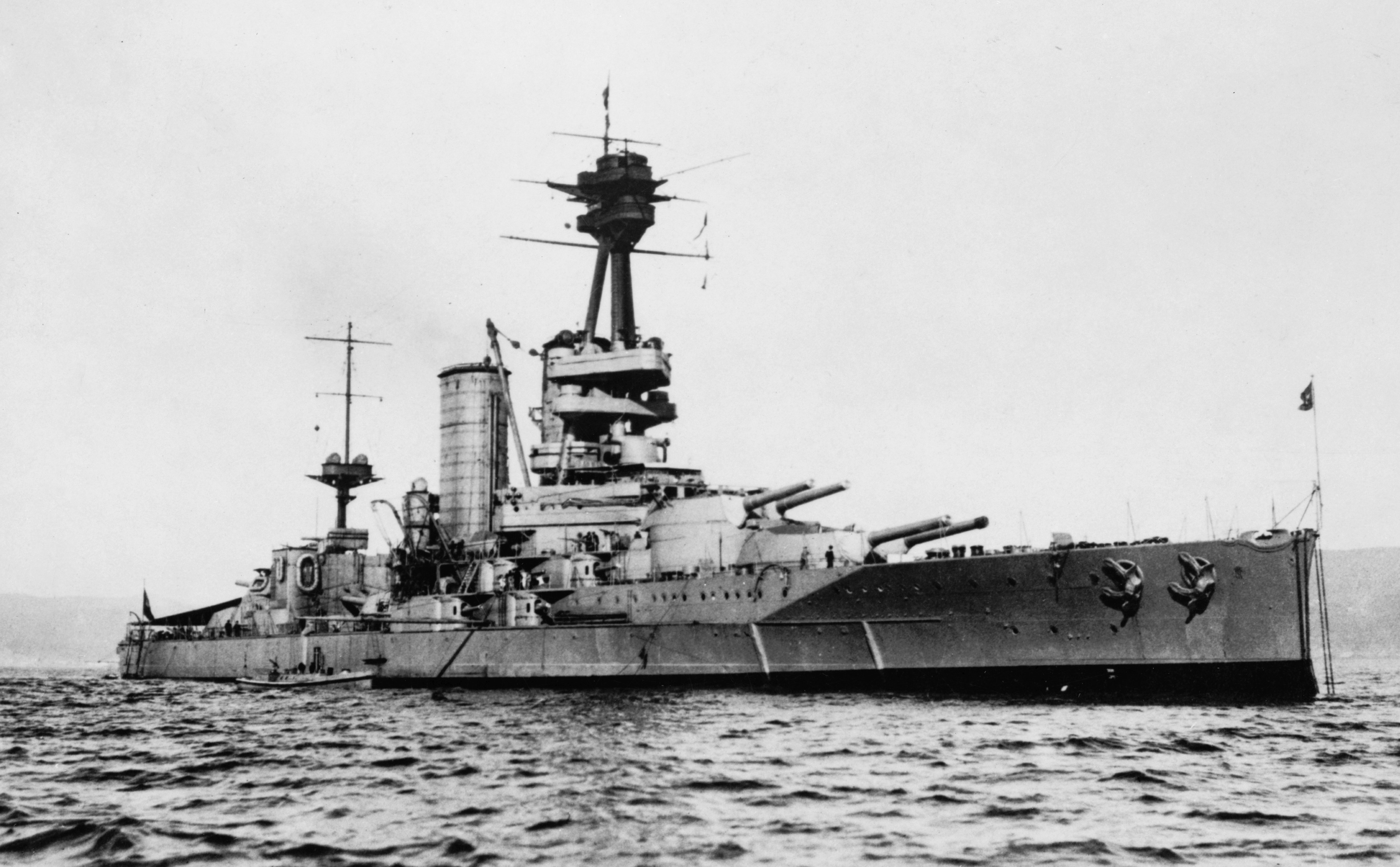
Chile's Almirante Latorre dreadnought in 1921

The early 20th century saw Chile fully consolidate its territory and resolve long-running diplomatic and territorial disputes. Its current borders with Argentina were finalized through British arbitration in 1902 and a bilateral settlement of the Puna de Atacama dispute the following year. In 1904, Chile and Bolivia signed a Treaty of Peace and Friendship which clarified the border between both countries.

The Chilean economy partially degenerated into a system protecting the interests of a ruling oligarchy. By the 1920s, the emerging middle and working classes were powerful enough to elect a reformist president, Arturo Alessandri, whose program was frustrated by a conservative congress. In the 1920s, Marxist groups with strong popular support arose.

A military coup led by General Luis Altamirano in 1924 set off a period of political instability that lasted until 1932. Of the ten governments that held power in that period, the longest lasting was that of General Carlos Ibáñez del Campo, who briefly ruled as de facto dictator in 1925 and then again between 1927 and 1931. These authoritarian governments were comparatively less harsh and corrupt than counterparts elsewhere in Latin America.

By relinquishing power to a democratically elected successor, Ibáñez del Campo retained the respect of a large enough segment of the population to remain a viable politician for more than thirty years, in spite of the vague and shifting nature of his ideology. When constitutional rule was restored in 1932, a strong middle-class party, the Radicals, emerged. It became the key force in coalition governments for the next 20 years. During the period of Radical Party dominance (1932–52), the state increased its role in the economy. In 1952, voters returned Ibáñez del Campo to office for another six years. Jorge Alessandri succeeded Ibáñez del Campo in 1958, bringing Chilean conservatism back into power democratically for another term.

The 1964 presidential election of Christian Democrat Eduardo Frei Montalva by an absolute majority initiated a period of major reform. Under the slogan "Revolution in Liberty", the Frei administration embarked on far-reaching social and economic programs, particularly in education, housing, and agrarian reform, including rural unionization of agricultural workers. By 1967, however, Frei encountered increasing opposition from leftists, who charged that his reforms were inadequate, and from conservatives, who found them excessive. At the end of his term, Frei had not fully achieved his party's ambitious goals.

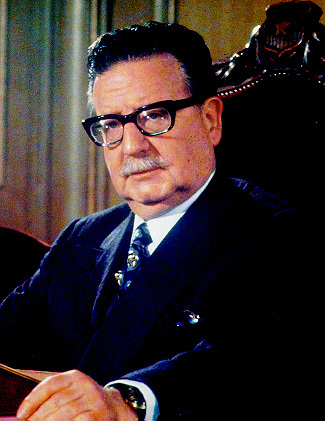
Salvador Allende

In the 1970 election, Senator Salvador Allende of the Socialist Party of Chile (then part of the "Popular Unity" coalition which included the Communists, Radicals, Social-Democrats, dissident Christian Democrats, the Popular Unitary Action Movement, and the Independent Popular Action), achieved a partial majority in a plurality of votes in a three-way contest, followed by candidates Radomiro Tomic for the Christian Democrat Party and Jorge Alessandri for the Conservative Party. Allende was not elected with an absolute majority, receiving fewer than 35% of the votes.

The Chilean Congress conducted a runoff vote between the leading candidates, Allende and former president Jorge Alessandri, and, keeping with tradition, chose Allende by a vote of 153 to 35. Frei refused to form an alliance with Alessandri to oppose Allende, on the grounds that the Christian Democrats were a workers' party and could not make common cause with the right wing.

An economic depression that began in 1972 was exacerbated by capital flight, plummeting private investment, and withdrawal of bank deposits in response to Allende's socialist program. Production fell and unemployment rose. Allende adopted measures including price freezes, wage increases, and tax reforms, to increase consumer spending and redistribute income downward. Joint public-private public works projects helped reduce unemployment. Much of the banking sector was nationalized. Many enterprises within the copper, coal, iron, nitrate, and steel industries were expropriated, nationalized, or subjected to state intervention. Industrial output increased sharply and unemployment fell during the Allende administration's first year.

Allende's program included advancement of workers' interests, replacing the judicial system with "socialist legality", nationalization of banks and forcing others to bankruptcy, and strengthening "popular militias" known as MIR. Started under former President Frei, the Popular Unity platform also called for nationalization of Chile's major copper mines in the form of a constitutional amendment. The measure was passed unanimously by Congress. As a result, the Richard Nixon administration organized and inserted secret operatives in Chile, in order to swiftly destabilize Allende's government. In addition, US financial pressure restricted international economic credit to Chile.

The economic problems were also exacerbated by Allende's public spending, financed mostly through printing money, and by poor credit ratings given by commercial banks. Simultaneously, opposition media, politicians, business guilds and other organizations helped to accelerate a campaign of domestic political and economical destabilization, some of which was backed by the United States. By early 1973, inflation was out of control. On 26 May 1973, Chile's Supreme Court, which was opposed to Allende's government, unanimously denounced Allende's disruption of the legality of the nation. Although illegal under the Chilean constitution, the court supported and strengthened Pinochet's soon-to-be seizure of power.

==== Pinochet era (1973–1990) ====
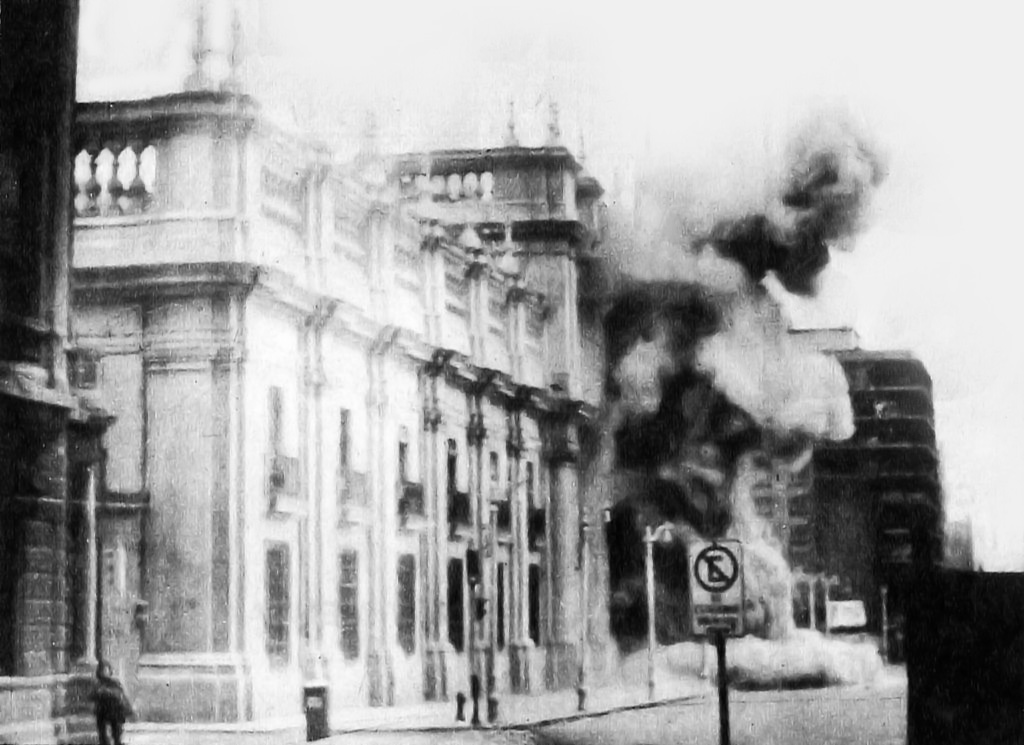
Fighter jets bombing the Presidential Palace of La Moneda during the Chilean coup of 1973

On 11 September 1973, a military coup overthrew Allende, who apparently committed suicide as the armed forces bombarded the presidential palace. The degree to which the United States was involved in the coup remains debated; after Allende was overthrown, U.S. Secretary of State Henry Kissinger told U.S. president Richard Nixon that the United States had "helped" the coup indirectly. Historian Sebastián Hurtado contends there is no documentary evidence to support that the U.S. government was actively involved in the coordination and execution of the coup; however, upon Allende's election in 1970, Kissinger had stated "I don't see why we need to stand by and watch a country go Communist due to the irresponsibility of its own people", while Nixon had expressed that the Allende government should not be consolidated and acted decisively to destabilize his government.

A military junta, led by General Augusto Pinochet, took control of the country. His regime was marked by widespread human rights violations. Chile initiated and actively participated in Operation Condor, a U.S.-backed campaign to suppress leftists and their sympathizers. In October 1973, at least 72 people were murdered by the Caravan of Death. According to the Rettig Report and Valech Commission, during the Pinochet regime's 15-year rule, at least 2,115 were killed, and at least 27,265 were tortured (including 88 children younger than 12 years old); many were detained, tortured, and executed at the national stadium. In 2011, Chile recognized an additional 9,800 victims, bringing the total number killed, tortured or imprisoned for political reasons to 40,018. Among the victims was internationally known poet-singer Víctor Jara.

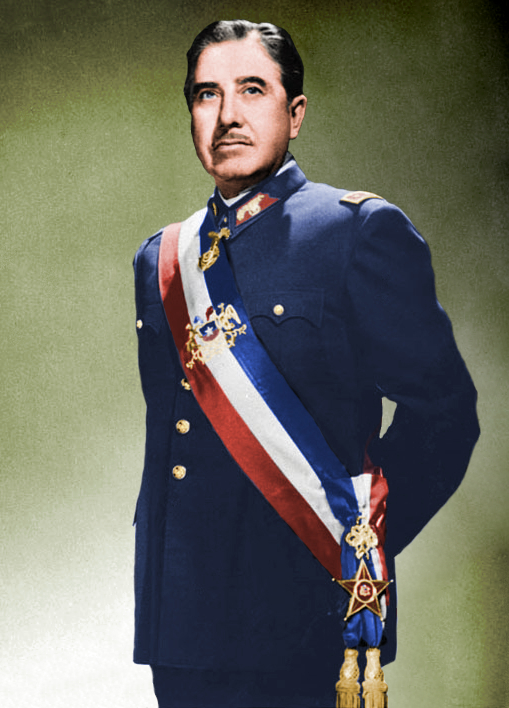
Augusto Pinochet

A new Constitution was approved by a controversial plebiscite on 11 September 1980, and General Pinochet became president of the republic for an eight-year term. After Pinochet obtained rule of the country, several hundred committed Chilean revolutionaries joined the Sandinista army in Nicaragua, guerrilla forces in Argentina or training camps in Cuba, Eastern Europe and Northern Africa.

In the late 1980s, largely as a result of events such as the 1982 economic collapse and mass civil resistance in 1983–1988, the government gradually permitted greater freedom of assembly, speech, and association, to include trade union and political activity. The government launched market-oriented reforms with Hernán Büchi as Minister of Finance. Chile moved toward a free market economy that saw an increase in domestic and foreign private investment, although the copper industry and other important mineral resources were not opened to competition. In a plebiscite on 5 October 1988, Pinochet was denied a second eight-year term as president (56% against 44%). Chileans elected a new president and the majority of members of a bicameral congress on 14 December 1989. Christian Democrat Patricio Aylwin, the candidate of a coalition of 17 political parties called the Concertación, received an absolute majority of votes (55%). President Aylwin served from 1990 to 1994, in what was considered a transition period.

=== 21st century ===
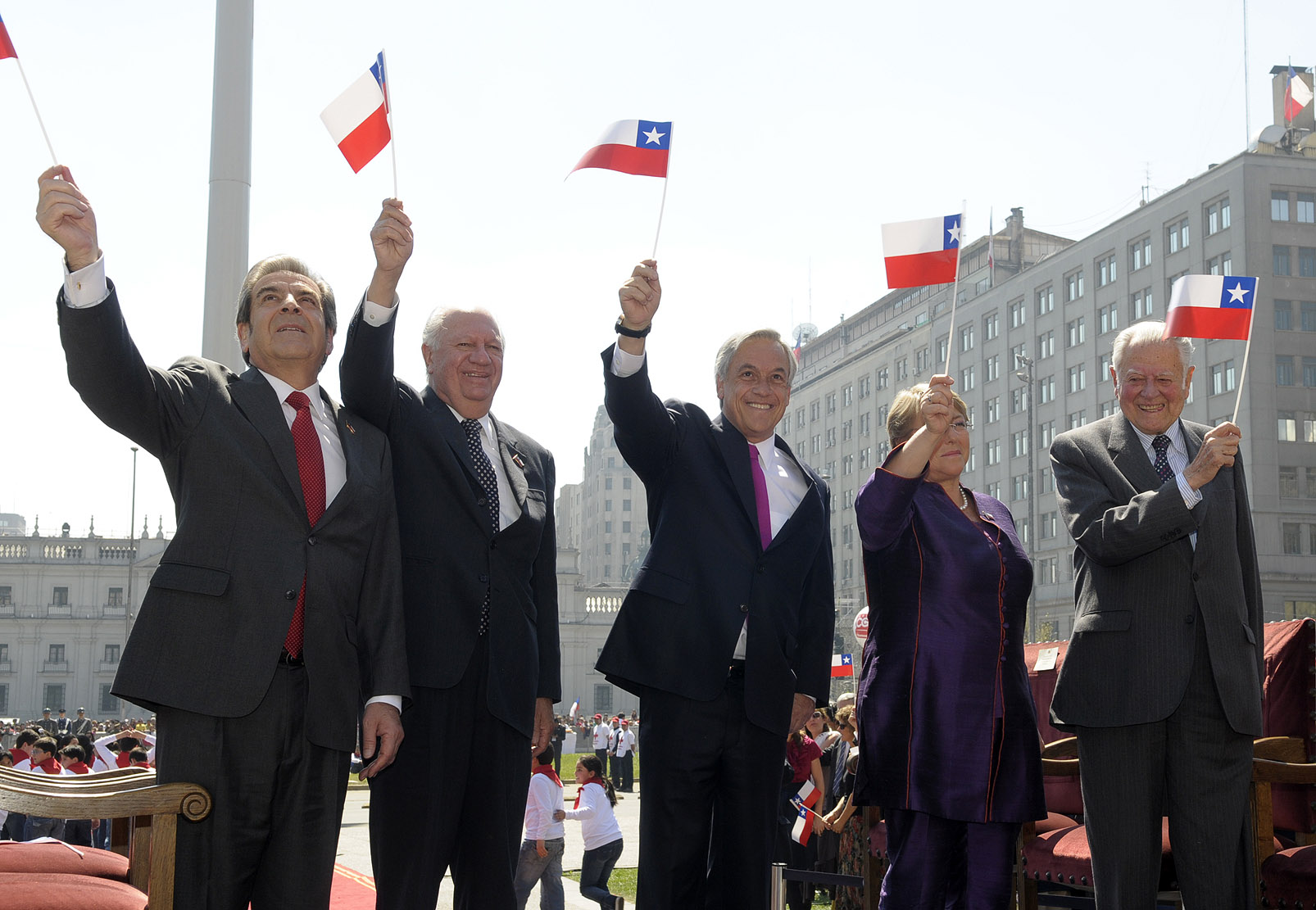
The first five presidents of Chile since its Transition to democracy (1990–2022), celebrating the Bicentennial of Chile

In December 1993, Christian Democrat Eduardo Frei Ruiz-Tagle, the son of previous president Eduardo Frei Montalva, led the Concertación coalition to victory with an absolute majority of votes (58%). Frei Ruiz-Tagle was succeeded in 2000 by Socialist Ricardo Lagos, who won the presidency in an unprecedented runoff election against Joaquín Lavín of the rightist Alliance for Chile. In January 2006, Chileans elected their first female president, Michelle Bachelet Jeria, of the Socialist Party, defeating Sebastián Piñera, of the National Renewal party, extending the Concertación governance for another four years. In January 2010, Chileans elected Sebastián Piñera as the first rightist President in 20 years, defeating former President Eduardo Frei Ruiz-Tagle of the Concertación, for a four-year term succeeding Bachelet. Due to term limits, Sebastián Piñera did not stand for re-election in 2013, and his term expired in March 2014 resulting in Michelle Bachelet returning to office. Sebastián Piñera succeeded Bachelet again in 2018 as the President of Chile after winning the December 2017 presidential election.

On 27 February 2010, Chile was struck by an 8.8 M_{w} earthquake, the fifth largest ever recorded at the time. More than 500 people died (most from the ensuing tsunami) and over a million people lost their homes. The earthquake was also followed by multiple aftershocks. Initial damage estimates were in the range of US$15–30 billion, around 10% to 15% of Chile's real gross domestic product.

Chile achieved global recognition for the successful rescue of 33 trapped miners in 2010. On 5 August 2010, the access tunnel collapsed at the San José copper and gold mine in the Atacama Desert near Copiapó in northern Chile, trapping 33 men 700 meters (2,300 ft) below ground. A rescue effort organized by the Chilean government located the miners 17 days later. All 33 men were brought to the surface two months later on 13 October 2010 over a period of almost 24 hours, an effort that was carried on live television around the world.

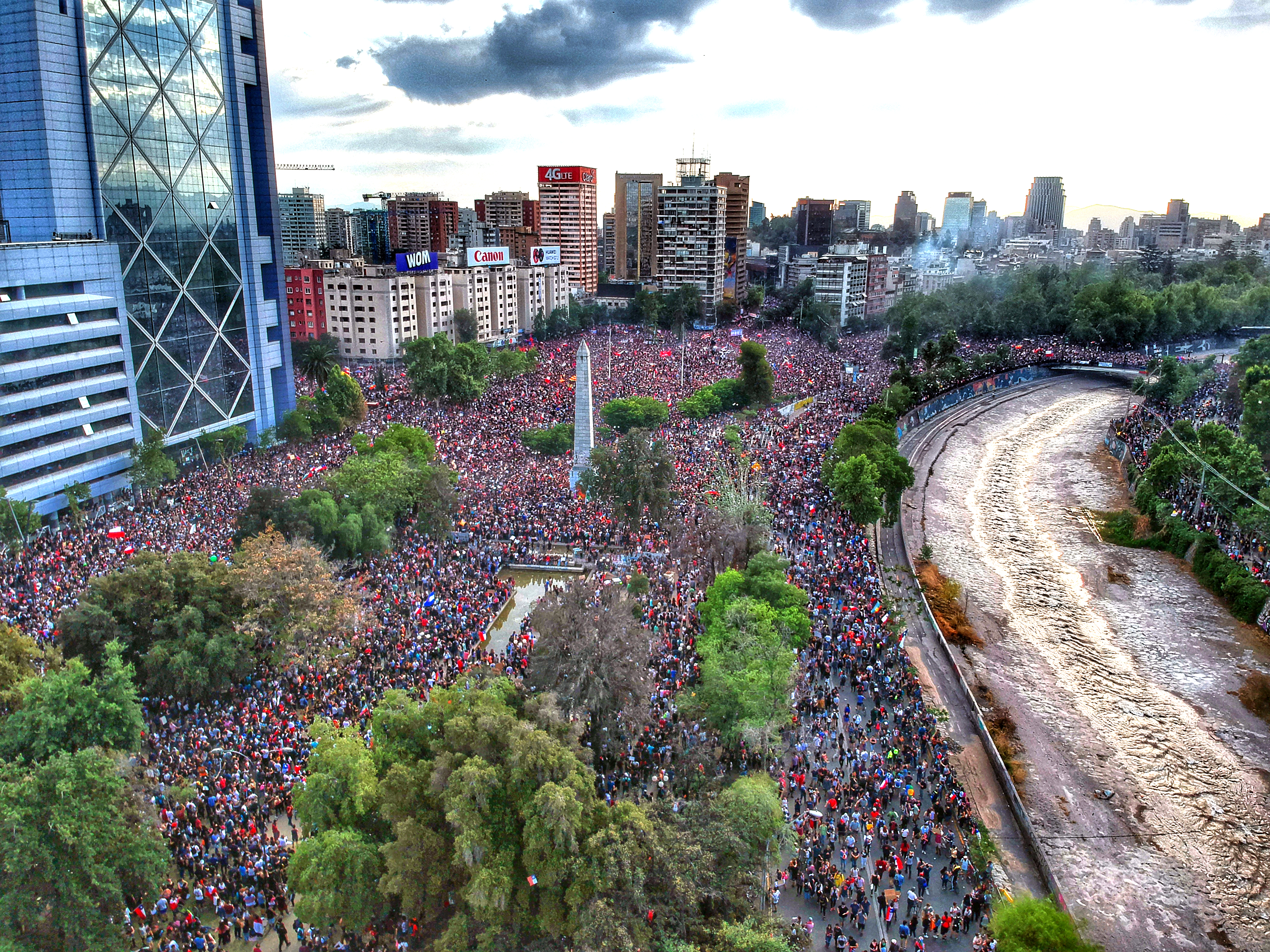
View of the 2019–2022 Chilean protests towards Plaza Baquedano, Santiago

From 2019 to 2022, Chile endured a series of nationwide protests in response to a rise in the Santiago Metro's subway fare, the increased cost of living, privatization, and inequality. On 15 November, most of the political parties represented in the National Congress signed an agreement to call a national referendum in April 2020 regarding the creation of a new Constitution, later postponed to October due to the COVID-19 pandemic. On 25 October 2020, Chileans voted 78.28 percent in favor of a new constitution, while 21.72 percent rejected the change; voter turnout was 51 percent. An election for the members of the Constitutional Convention was held in Chile between 15 and 16 May 2021; the results saw a complete rearrangement of the political system established since the end of Pinochet's dictatorship in 1990, with various independent and leftist candidates performing strongly relative to conventional center-right and center-left parties.

On 19 December 2021, a leftist candidate, the 35-year-old former student protest leader Gabriel Boric, won Chile's presidential election to become the country's youngest leader. On 11 March 2022, Boric was sworn in as president to succeed outgoing President Sebastian Piñera. The majority of Boric's Cabinet—14 out of 24—were women, which was the first in the Western Hemisphere.

On 4 September 2022, voters rejected the new constitution proposal in the constitutional referendum, which was put forward by the left-leaning Constitutional Convention. On 17 December 2023, voters rejected a second new constitution proposal in a new constitutional referendum, written by the conservative-led Constitutional Council.

On 14 December 2025, conservative candidate José Antonio Kast won Chile's presidential election decisively with more than 58% of the vote. This result was widely described as marking a shift to the right in Chilean politics. In Kast's first speech as the president elect he stated "Chile will once again be free from crime, free from anguish, free from fear". On 11 March 2026, José Antonio Kast was sworn in as Chile's president, meaning the most significant rightward shift in Chile since the return of democracy in 1990.

== Geography ==
Natural regions of Chile

A long and narrow coastal Southern Cone country on the west side of the Andes Mountains, Chile stretches over 4,300 km (2,670 mi) north to south, but only 350 km (217 mi) at its widest point east to west and 64 km (40 mi) at its narrowest point east to west, with an average width of 175 km (109 mi). This encompasses a large variety of climates and landscapes. It contains 756,950 square kilometers (292,260 sq mi) of land area. It is situated within the Pacific Ring of Fire. Excluding its Pacific islands and Antarctic claim, Chile lies between latitudes 17° and 56°S, and longitudes 66° and 75°W.

Chile is among the longest north–south countries in the world. If one considers only mainland territory, Chile is unique within this group in its narrowness from east to west, with the other long north–south countries (including Brazil, Russia, Canada, and the United States, among others) all being wider from east to west by a factor of more than 10. Chile also claims 1,250,000 km^{2} (480,000 sq mi) of Antarctica as part of its territory (Chilean Antarctic Territory). However, this latter claim is suspended under the terms of the Antarctic Treaty, of which Chile is a signatory. It is the world's southernmost country that is geographically on the mainland.

Chile controls Easter Island and Sala y Gómez Island, the easternmost islands of Polynesia, which it incorporated to its territory in 1888, and the Juan Fernández Islands, more than 600 km (370 mi) from the mainland. Also controlled but only temporarily inhabited (by some local fishermen) are the small islands of San Ambrosio and San Felix. These islands are notable because they extend Chile's claim to territorial waters out from its coast into the Pacific Ocean.

The northern Atacama Desert contains great mineral wealth, primarily copper and nitrates. The relatively small Central Valley, which includes Santiago, dominates the country in terms of population and agricultural resources. This area is also the historical center from which Chile expanded in the late 19th century when it integrated the northern and southern regions. Southern Chile is rich in forests, grazing lands, and features a string of volcanoes and lakes. The southern coast is a labyrinth of fjords, inlets, canals, twisting peninsulas, and islands. The Andes Mountains are located on the eastern border.

=== Topography ===
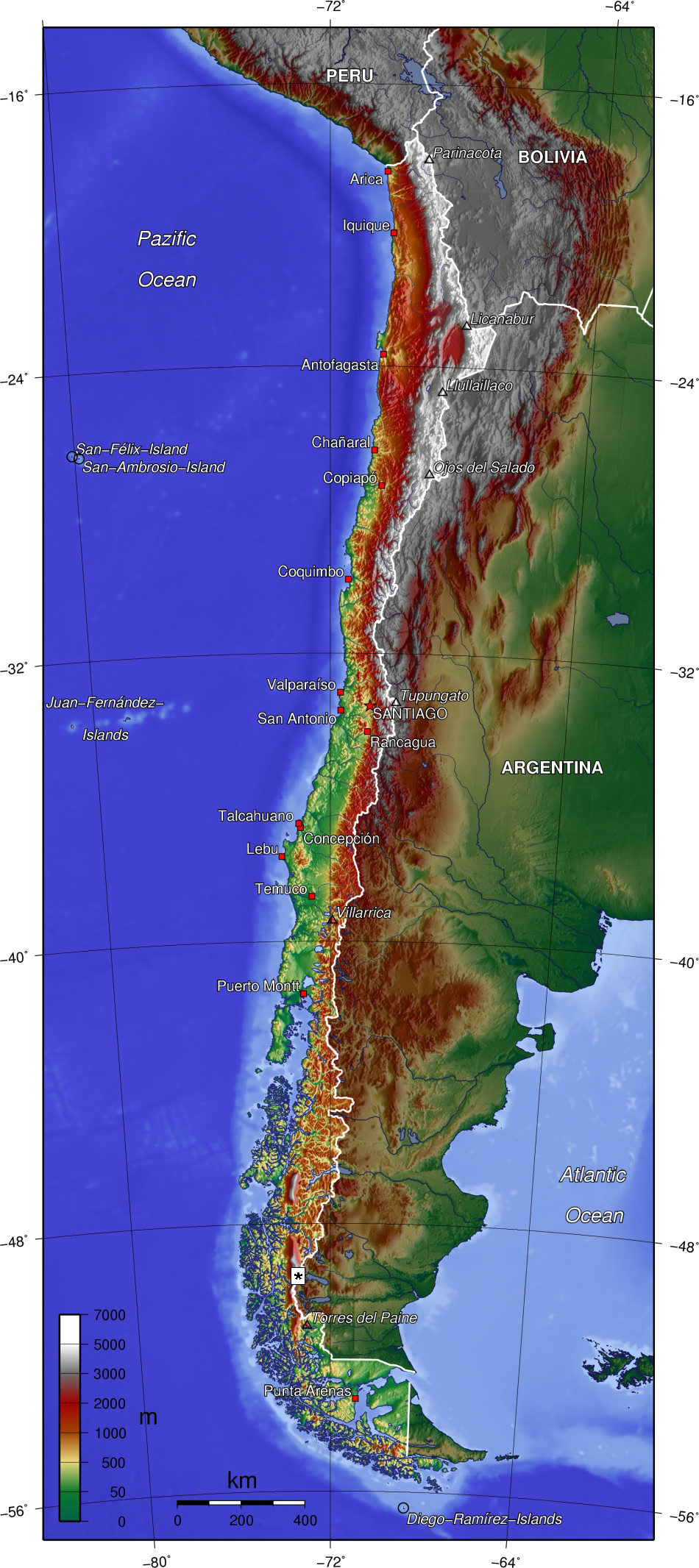
Topographic map of Chile

Chile is located along a highly seismic and volcanic zone, part of the Pacific Ring of Fire, due to the subduction of the Nazca and Antarctic plates in the South American Plate. In the late Paleozoic, 251 million years ago, Chile belonged to the continental block called Gondwana. It was just a depression that accumulated marine sediments began to rise at the end of the Mesozoic, 66 million years ago, due to the collision between the Nazca Plate and South American Plate, resulting in the Andes. The territory would be shaped over millions of years by the folding of the rocks, forming the current relief.

The Chilean relief consists of the central depression, which crosses the country longitudinally, flanked by two mountain ranges that make up about 80% of the territory: the Andes Mountains to the east-natural border with Bolivia and Argentina in the region of Atacama and the Coastal Range west-minor height from the Andes. Chile's highest peak is the Nevado Ojos del Salado, at 6891.3 m, which is also the highest volcano in the world. The highest point of the Coastal Range is Vicuña Mackenna, at 3114 meters, located in the Sierra Vicuña Mackenna, the south of Antofagasta. Among the coastal mountains and the Pacific is a series of coastal plains, of variable length, which allow the settlement of coastal towns and big ports. Some areas of the plains territories encompass territory east of the Andes, and the Patagonian steppes and Magellan, or are high plateaus surrounded by high mountain ranges, such as the Altiplano or Puna de Atacama.

The Far North is the area between the northern boundary of the country and the parallel 26° S, covering the first three regions. It is characterized by the presence of the Atacama Desert, the most arid in the world. The desert is fragmented by streams that originate in the area known as the pampas Tamarugal. The Andes, split in two and whose eastern arm runs through Bolivia, has a high altitude and volcanic activity, which has allowed the formation of the Andean altiplano and salt structures as the Salar de Atacama, due to the gradual accumulation of sediments over time.

To the south is the Norte Chico, extending to the Aconcagua River. Los Andes begin to decrease its altitude to the south and closer to the coast, reaching 90 km away at the height of Illapel, the narrowest part of the Chilean territory. The two mountain ranges intersect, virtually eliminating the intermediate depression. The existence of rivers flowing through the territory allows the formation of transverse valleys, where agriculture has developed strongly in recent times, while the coastal plains begin to expand.

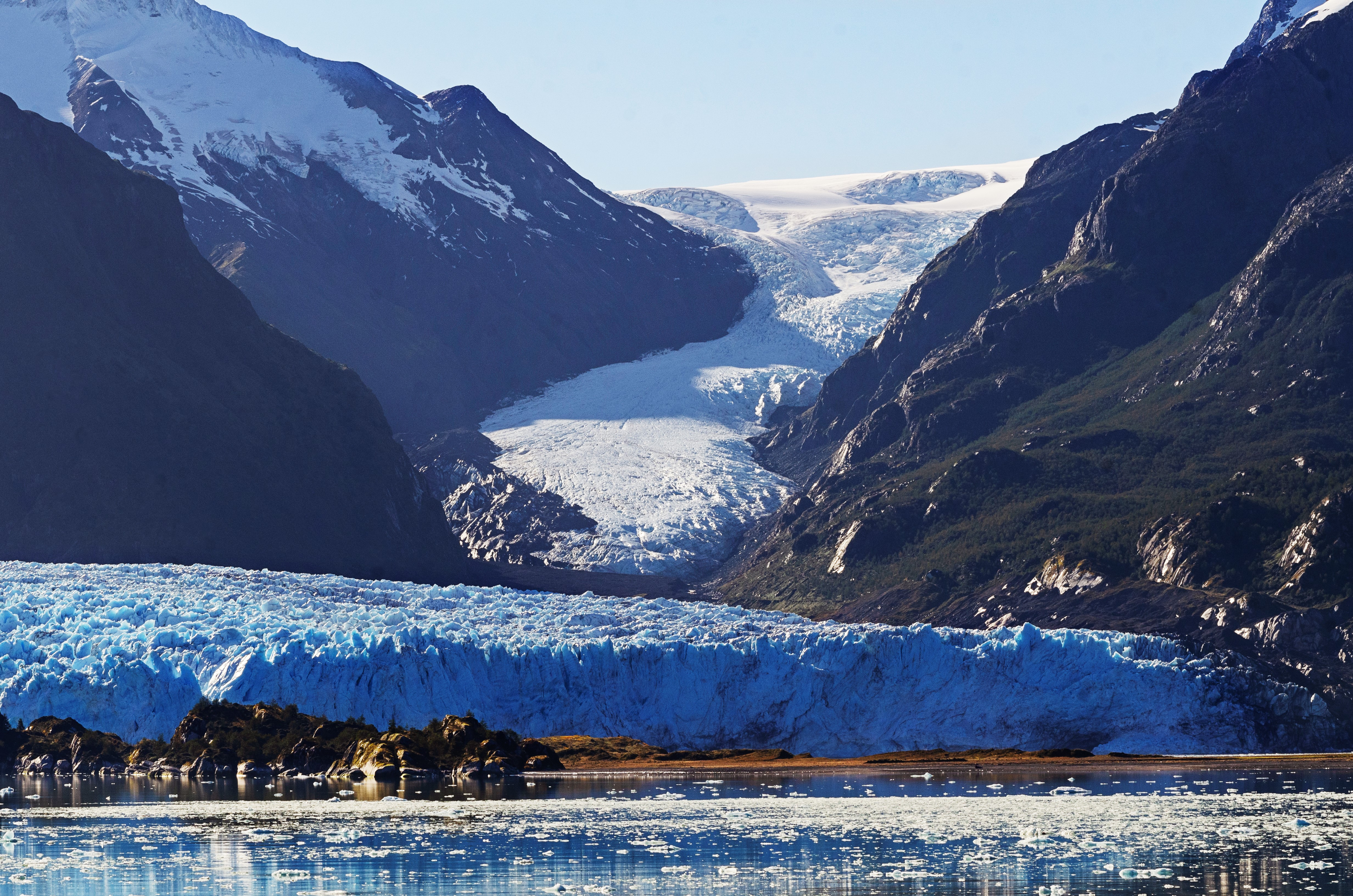
Amalia Glacier, located in Bernardo O'Higgins National Park

The Central area is the most populated region of the country. The coastal plains are wide and allow the establishment of cities and ports along the Pacific. The Andes maintain altitudes above 6000m but descend slowly in height to 4000 meters on average. The intermediate depression reappears becoming a fertile valley that allows agricultural development and human settlement, due to sediment accumulation. To the south, the Cordillera de la Costa reappears in the Cordillera de Nahuelbuta while glacial sediments create a series of lakes in the area of La Frontera.

Patagonia extends from within Reloncavi, at the height of parallel 41°S, to the south. During the last glaciation, this area was covered by ice that strongly eroded Chilean relief structures. As a result, the intermediate depression sinks in the sea, while the coastal mountains rise to a series of archipelagos, such as Chiloé and the Chonos, disappearing in Taitao peninsula, in the parallel 47°S. The Andes mountain range loses height and erosion caused by the action of glaciers has caused fjords. East of the Andes, on the continent, or north of it, on the island of Tierra del Fuego are located relatively flat plains, which in the Strait of Magellan cover large areas. The Andes, as he had done previously Cordillera de la Costa, begins to break in the ocean causing a myriad of islands and islets and disappear into it, sinking and reappearing in the Southern Antilles arc and then the Antarctic Peninsula, where it is called Antartandes, in the Chilean Antarctic Territory, lying between the meridians 53°W and 90°W.

In the middle of the Pacific, the country has sovereignty over several islands of volcanic origin, collectively known as Insular Chile. The archipelago of Juan Fernandez and Easter Island is located in the fracture zone between the Nazca plate and the Pacific plate known as East Pacific Rise.

=== Climate and hydrography ===
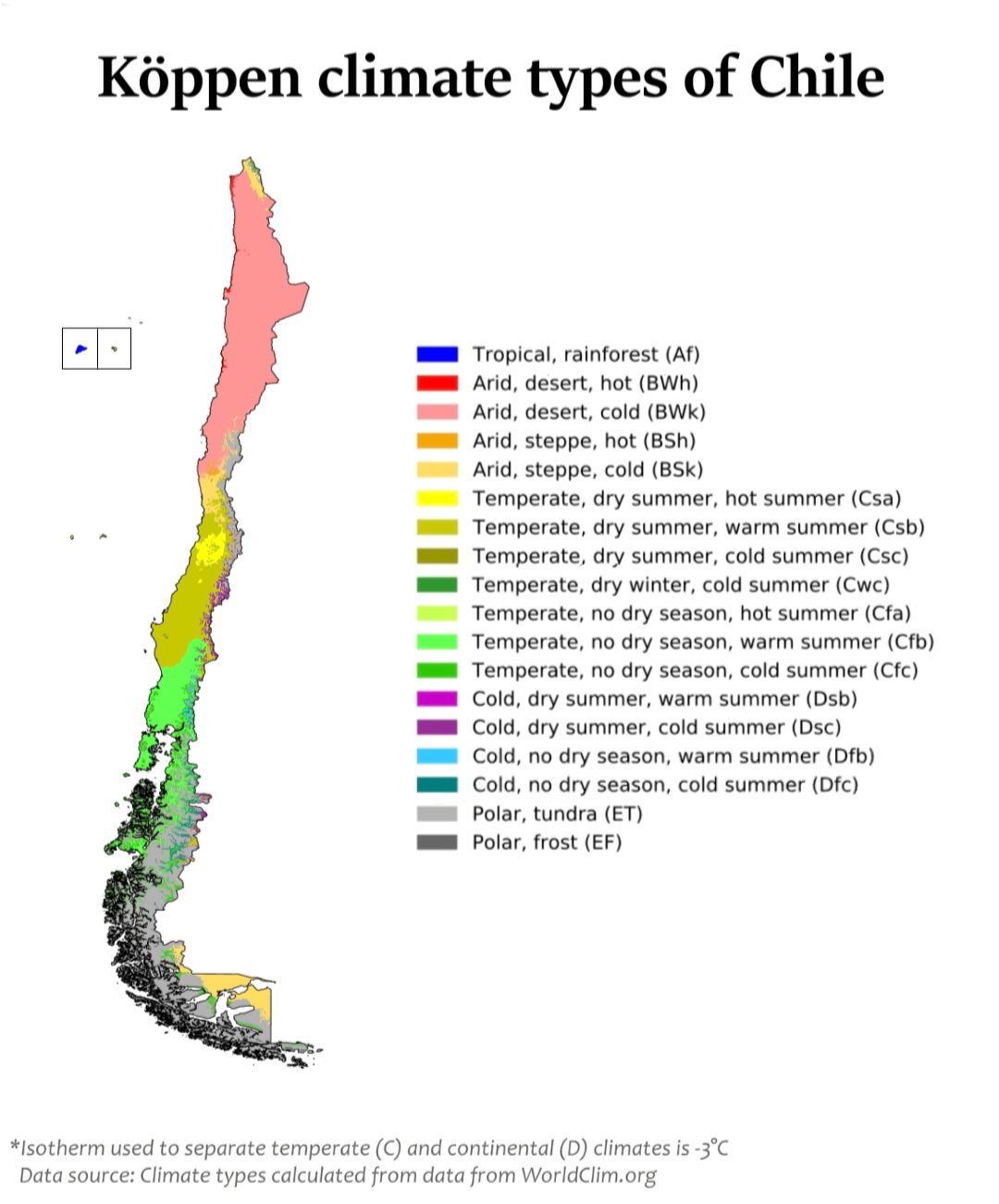
Chile map of Köppen climate classification

The diverse climate of Chile ranges from the world's driest desert in the north—the Atacama Desert—through a Mediterranean climate in the center, tropical in Easter Island, to an oceanic climate, including alpine tundra and glaciers in the east and south. According to the Köppen system, Chile within its borders hosts at least eighteen major climatic subtypes. There are four seasons in most of the country: summer (December to February), autumn (March to May), winter (June to August), and spring (September to November).

Due to the characteristics of the territory, Chile is crossed by numerous rivers generally short in length and with low flow rates. They commonly extend from the Andes to the Pacific Ocean, flowing from East to West. Because of the Atacama Desert, in the Norte Grande there are only short endorheic character streams, except for the Loa River, the longest in the country 440 km. In the high valleys, wetland areas generate Chungará Lake, located at 4500 meters above sea level. It and the Lauca River are shared with Bolivia, as well as the Lluta River. In the center-north of the country, the number of rivers that form valleys of agricultural importance increases. Noteworthy are the Elqui with 75 km long, 142 km Aconcagua, Maipo with 250 km and its tributary, the Mapocho with 110 km, and Maule with 240 km. Their waters mainly flow from Andean snowmelt in the summer and winter rains. The major lakes in this area are the artificial lake Rapel, the Colbun Maule lagoon and the lagoon of La Laja.

Climate change is expected to alter the frequency and severity of various natural hazards in Chile, including wildfires, floods, landslides, droughts and rising sea levels. Key sectors vulnerable to climate change impacts include agriculture, fisheries, agriculture and water security.

=== Biodiversity ===
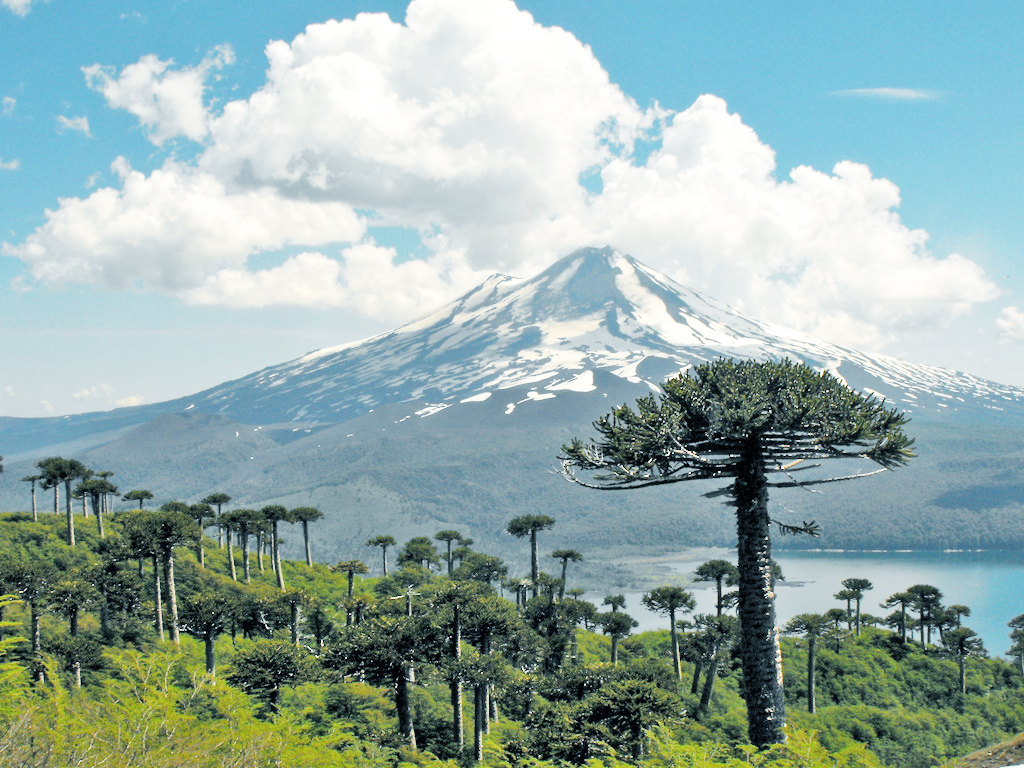
Araucaria araucana trees in Conguillío National Park

The flora and fauna of Chile are characterized by a high degree of endemism, due to its particular geography. In continental Chile, the Atacama Desert in the north and the Andes mountains to the east are barriers that have led to the isolation of flora and fauna. Add to that the enormous length of Chile (over 4,300 km (2,672 mi)) and this results in a wide range of climates and environments that can be divided into three general zones: the desert provinces of the north, central Chile, and the humid regions of the south.

The native flora of Chile consists of relatively few species compared to the flora of other South American countries. The northernmost coastal and central region is largely barren of vegetation, approaching the most absolute desert in the world.

On the slopes of the Andes, in addition to the scattered tola desert brush, grasses are found. The central valley is characterized by several species of cacti, the hardy espinos, the Chilean pine, the southern beeches and the copihue, a red bell-shaped flower that is Chile's national flower.

In southern Chile, south of the Biobío River, heavy precipitation has produced dense forests of laurels, magnolias, and various species of conifers and beeches, which become smaller and more stunted to the south.

The cold temperatures and winds of the extreme south preclude heavy forestation. Grassland is found in East Magallanes Province and northern Tierra del Fuego (in Patagonia). Much of the Chilean flora is distinct from that of neighboring Argentina, indicating that the Andean barrier existed during its formation.

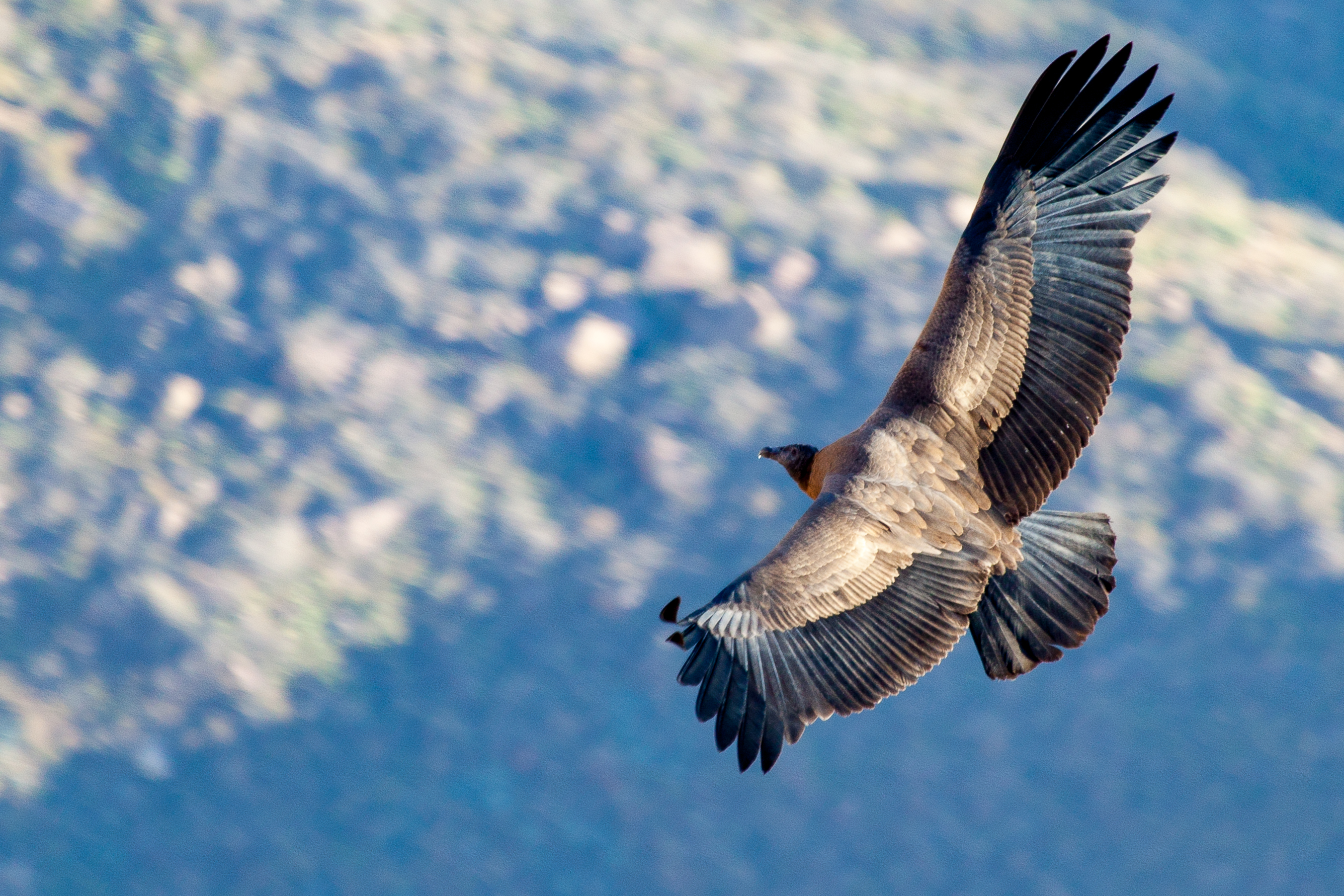
Andean condor (Vultur gryphus), the national bird of Chile

Some of Chile's flora has an Antarctic origin due to land bridges which formed during the Cretaceous ice ages, allowing plants to migrate from Antarctica to South America. Chile had a 2018 Forest Landscape Integrity Index mean score of 7.37/10, ranking it 43rd globally out of 172 countries.

Just over 3,000 species of fungi are recorded in Chile, but this number is far from complete. The true total number of fungal species occurring in Chile is likely to be far higher, given the generally accepted estimate that only about 7 percent of all fungi worldwide have so far been discovered. Although the amount of available information is still very small, a first effort has been made to estimate the number of fungal species endemic to Chile, and 1995 species have been tentatively identified as possible endemics of the country.

Chile's geographical isolation has restricted the immigration of faunal life so that only a few of the many distinctive South American animals are found. Among the larger mammals are the puma or cougar, the llama-like guanaco and the fox-like chilla. In the forest region, several types of marsupials and a small deer known as the pudu are found.

There are many species of small birds, but most of the larger common Latin American types are absent. Few freshwater fish are native, but North American trout have been successfully introduced into the Andean lakes. Owing to the vicinity of the Humboldt Current, ocean waters abound with fish and other forms of marine life, which in turn support a rich variety of waterfowl, including several penguins. Whales are abundant, and some six species of seals are found in the area.

== Government and politics ==
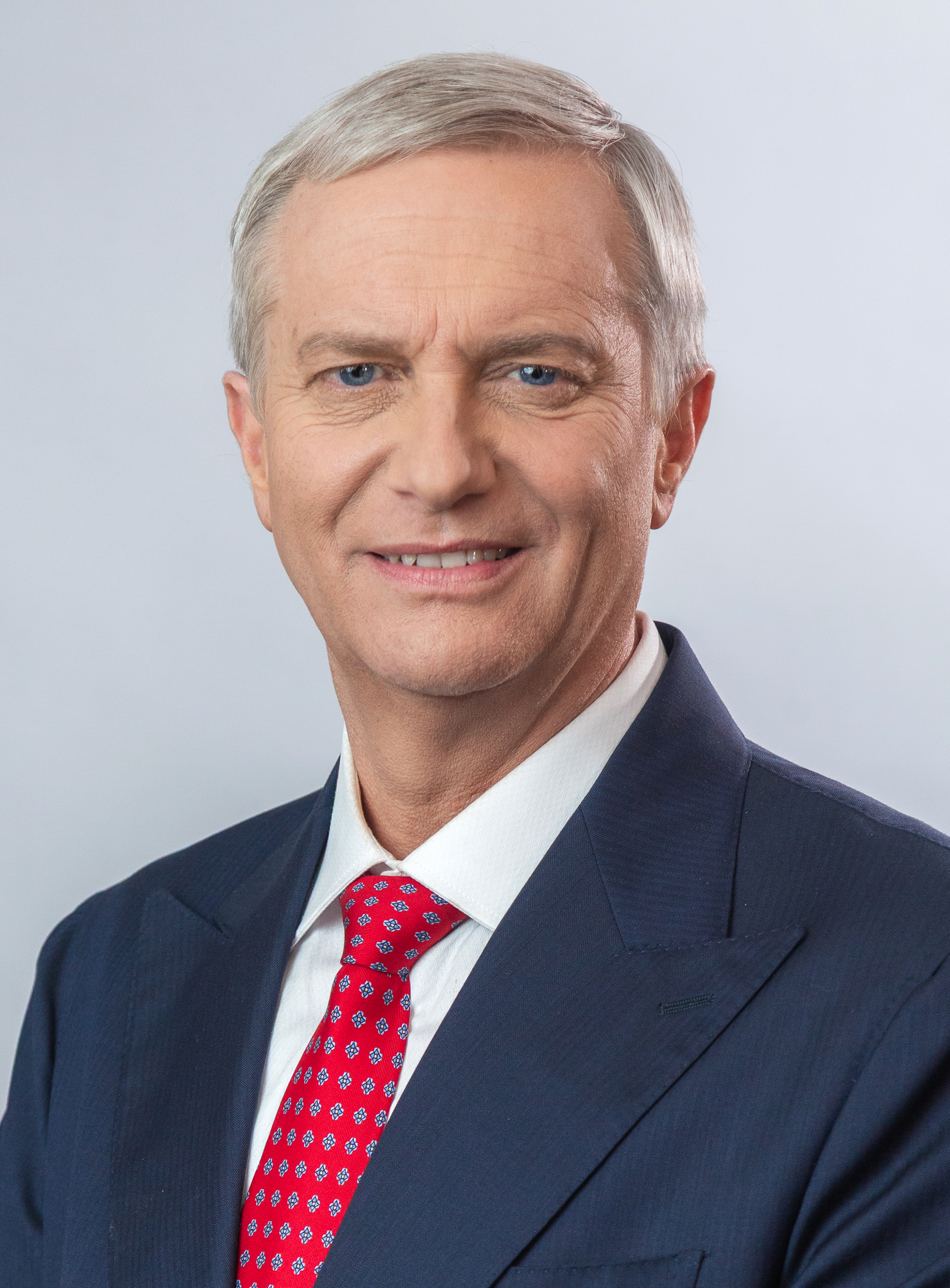
José Antonio Kast
President

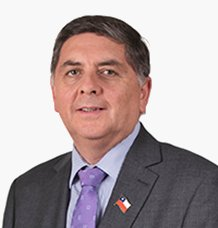
Claudio Alvarado
Minister of the Interior

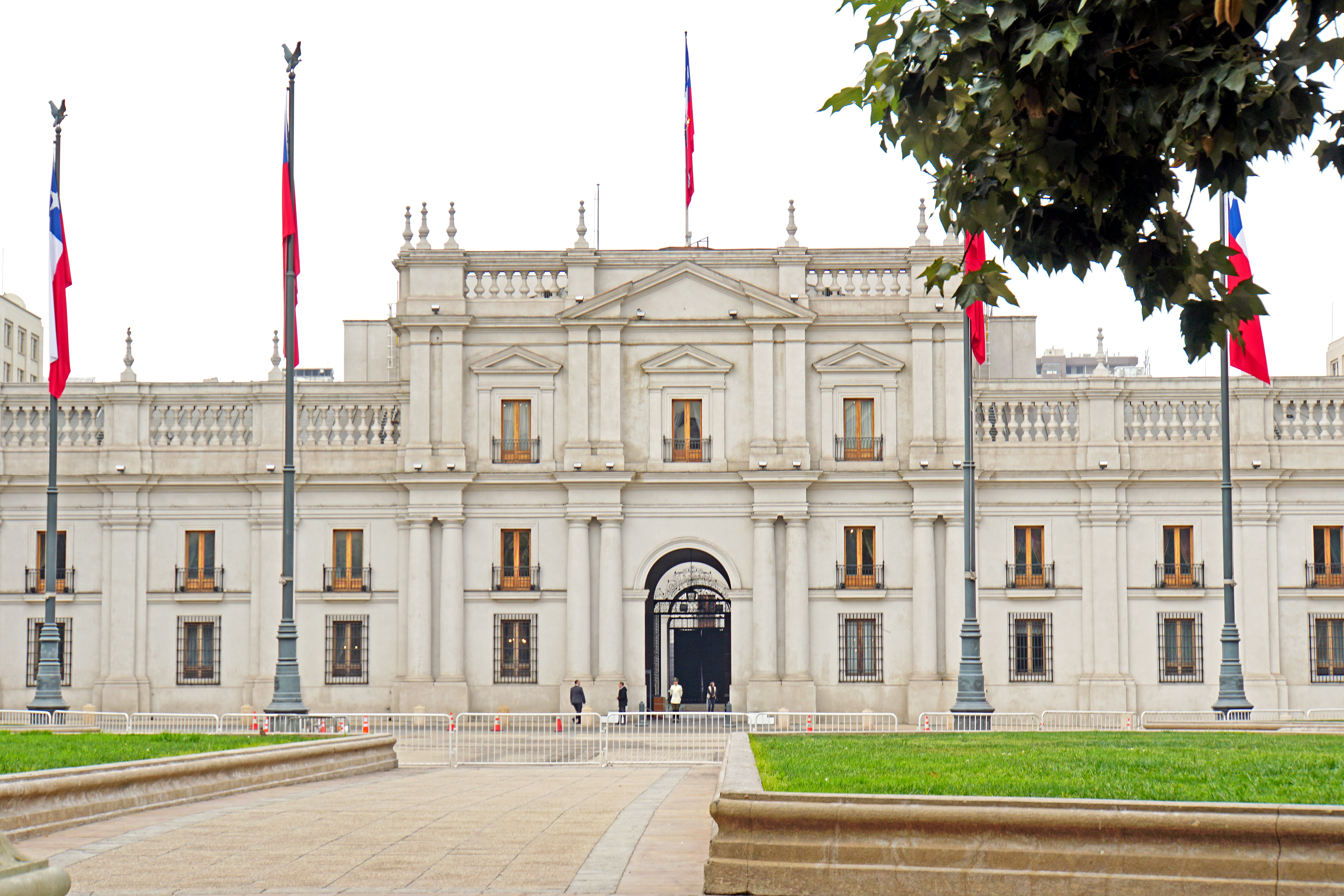
The Colonial Neoclassical Palacio de La Moneda in Santiago, built between 1784 and 1805, is the seat of the President of Chile.

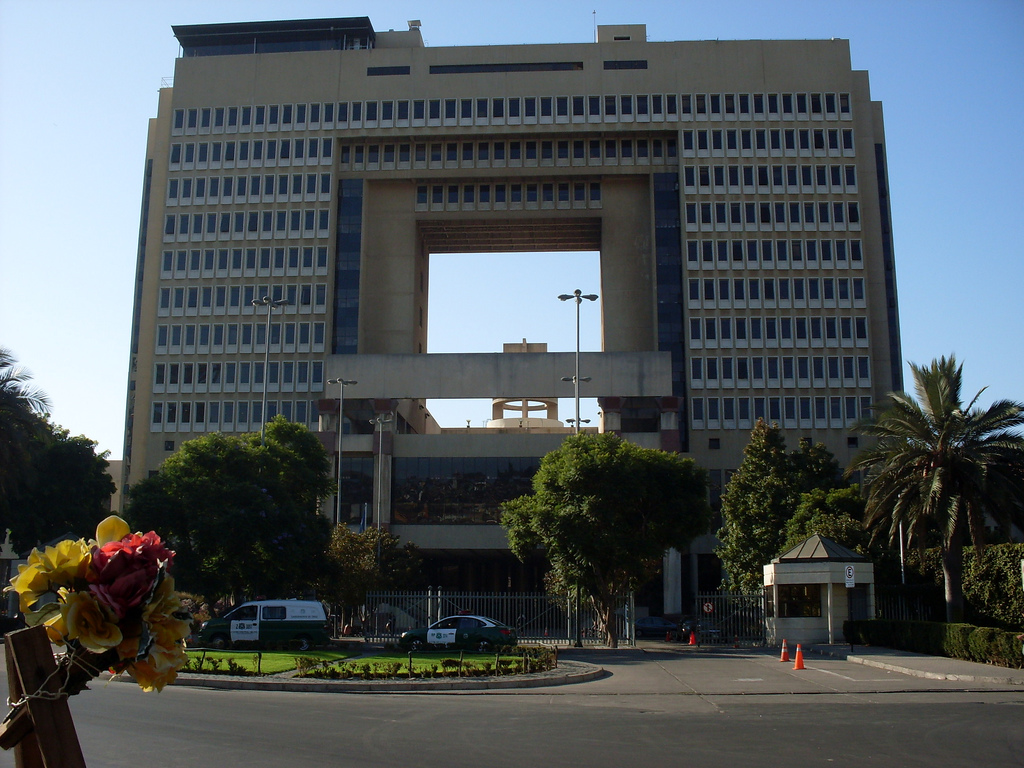
National Congress of Chile in the port city of Valparaíso

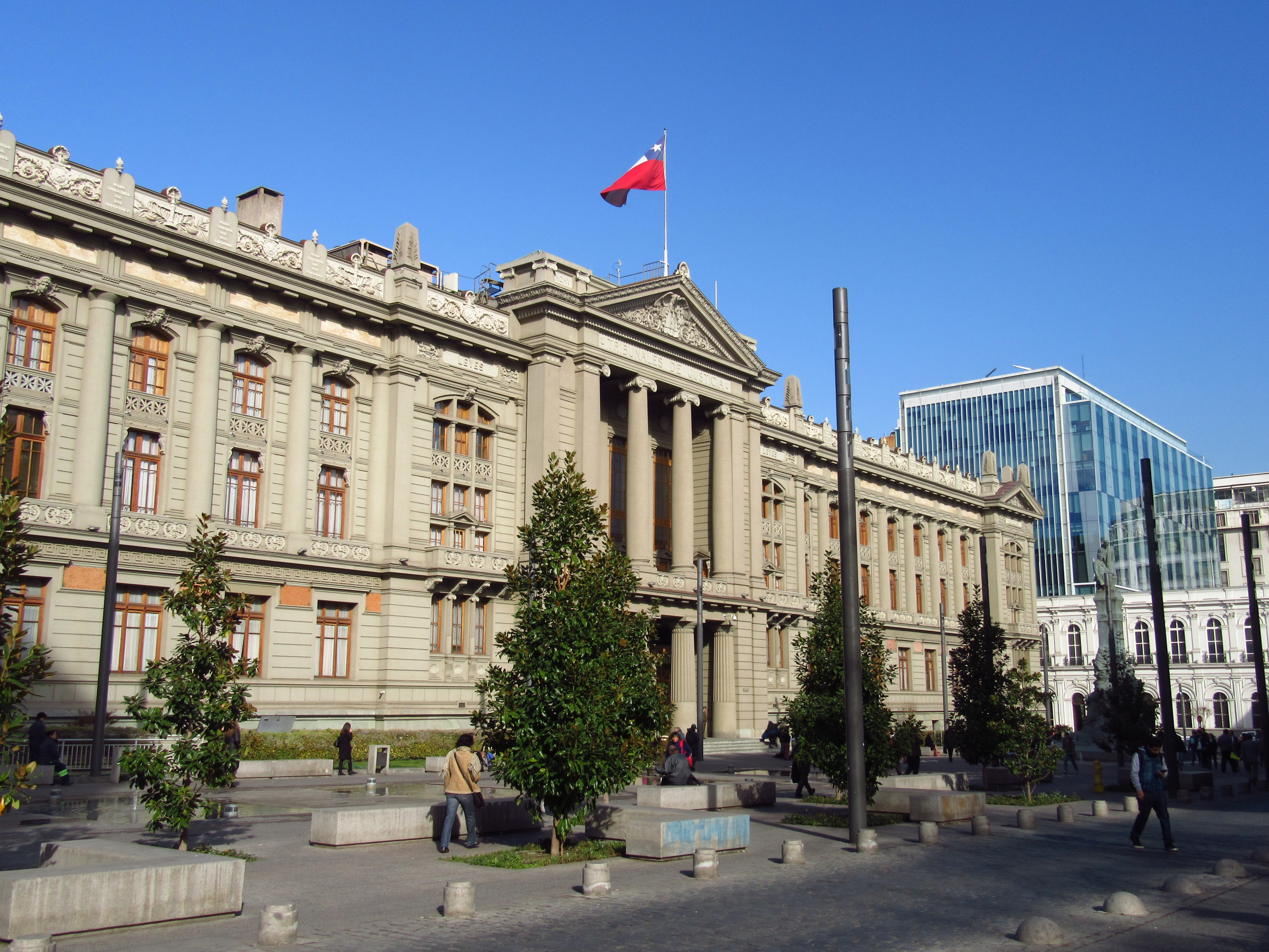
The Palace of Justice in Santiago

The current Constitution of Chile was drafted by Jaime Guzmán in 1980 and subsequently approved via a national plebiscite—regarded as "highly irregular" by some observers—in September of that year, under the military dictatorship of Augusto Pinochet. It entered into force in March 1981. After Pinochet's defeat in the 1988 plebiscite, the constitution was amended to ease provisions for future amendments to the Constitution. In September 2005, President Ricardo Lagos signed into law several constitutional amendments passed by Congress. These include eliminating the positions of appointed senators and senators for life, granting the President authority to remove the commanders-in-chief of the armed forces, and reducing the presidential term from six to four years.

Chile's judiciary is independent and includes a court of appeal, a system of military courts, a constitutional tribunal, and the Supreme Court of Chile. In June 2005, Chile completed a nationwide overhaul of its criminal justice system. The reform has replaced inquisitorial proceedings with an adversarial system with greater similarity to that of common law jurisdictions such as the United States.

For parliamentary elections, between 1989 and 2013 the binominal system was used, which promoted the establishment of two majority political blocs –Concertación and Alliance– at the expense of the exclusion of non-majority political groups. The opponents of this system approved in 2015 a moderate proportional electoral system that has been in force since the 2017 parliamentary elections, allowing the entry of new parties and coalitions. The Congress of Chile has a 50-seat Senate and a 155-member Chamber of Deputies. Senators serve for eight years with staggered terms, while deputies are elected every 4 years. The last congressional elections were held on 21 November 2021, concurrently with the presidential election. The Congress is located in the port city of Valparaíso, about 140 kilometers (90 miles) west of the capital, Santiago.

The main existing political coalitions in Chile are:

Government:

- Republican Party was founded by current President José Antonio Kast in 2019. Before assuming the presidency, he resigned from the party and took office as an independent politician.
- Chile Vamos (Let's go Chile) is a coalition and the successor to the Alliance coalition. It is composed of the Independent Democratic Union, National Renewal, and Political Evolution parties.

Opposition:

- Broad Front is the party of previous President Gabriel Boric, formed in 2024 as a merger of multiple left-wing parties.
- Democratic Socialism is a coalition with roots in the Concertación and New Majority coalitions. It is composed of the Socialist Party, the Party for Democracy, and the Liberal Party.
- Communist Party, a historic Marxist party.

In the National Congress, the Republican Party has 31 deputies and 5 senators, while Chile Vamos has 52 deputies and 24 senators. There are also 3 independent deputies who support the government, all formerly members of the dissolved Christian Social Party. The Broad Front has 18 deputies and 2 senators, Democratic Socialism 25 deputies and 12 senators, and the Communist Party has 12 deputies and 3 senators. Other parliamentary groups include the National Libertarian Party (8 deputies and 1 senator), Party of the People (14 deputies), Christian Democratic Party (8 deputies and 3 senators), the Social Green Regionalist Federation (2 deputies and 2 senators), and 2 additional independent senators.

According to International IDEA's Global State of Democracy (GSoD) Indices and Democracy Tracker, Chile performs in the mid to high range on overall democratic measures, with particular strengths in freedom of movement, freedom of religion, and elected government.

=== Administrative divisions ===
In 1978 Chile was administratively divided into regions, and in 1979 subdivided into provinces and these into communes. The country has 16 regions, 56 provinces and 348 communes.

Each region was designated by a name and a Roman numeral assigned from north to south, except for the Santiago Metropolitan Region, which did not have a number. The creation of two new regions in 2007, Arica and Parinacota (XV) and Los Ríos (XIV), and a third region in 2018, Ñuble (XVI) made this numbering lose its original order meaning.

Map of Regions of Chile

Administrative divisions of Chile
Region	Population	Area (km^{2})	Density	Capital
Arica y Parinacota	244,569	16,873.3	14.49	Arica
Tarapacá	369,806	42,225.8	8.76	Iquique
Antofagasta	635,416	126,049.1	5.04	Antofagasta
Atacama	299,180	75,176.2	3.98	Copiapó
Coquimbo	832,864	40,579.9	20.57	La Serena
Valparaíso	1,896,053	16,396.1	115.64	Valparaíso
Santiago Metropolitan	7,400,741	15,403.2	480.47	Santiago
Libertador General Bernardo O'Higgins	987,228	16,387	60.24	Rancagua
Maule	1,123,008	30,296.1	37.07	Talca
Ñuble	512,289	13,178.5	38.87	Chillán
Biobío	1,613,059	23,890.2	67.52	Concepción
Araucanía	1,010,423	31,842.3	31.73	Temuco
Los Ríos	398,230	18,429.5	21.61	Valdivia
Los Lagos	890,284	48,583.6	18.32	Puerto Montt
Aysén del General Carlos Ibáñez del Campo	100,745	108,494.4	0.93	Coyhaique
Magallanes and Chilean Antarctica	166,537	132,297.2^{(1)}	1.26	Punta Arenas
Chile	18,480,432	756,102.4^{(2)}	24.44	Santiago

^{(1)}Including the Chilean Antarctic Territory, its surface reaches 1,382,554.8 km^{2}

^{(2)}Including the Chilean Antarctic Territory, its surface reaches 2,006,360 km^{2}

=== Foreign relations ===
State of Chile's international relations in the world: Chile Country with diplomatic relations and Chilean embassy in the country. Country with diplomatic relations and an embassy in Chile, but no Chilean embassy. Country with diplomatic relations but without ambassadors. Country with no diplomatic relations currently.

Since the early decades after independence, Chile has always had an active involvement in foreign affairs. In 1837, the country aggressively challenged the dominance of Peru's port of Callao for preeminence in the Pacific trade routes, defeating the short-lived alliance between Peru and Bolivia, the Peru–Bolivian Confederation (1836–39) in the War of the Confederation. The war dissolved the confederation while distributing power in the Pacific. A second international war, the War of the Pacific (1879–83), further increased Chile's regional role, while adding considerably to its territory.

During the 19th century, Chile's commercial ties were primarily with Britain, which helped shape the Chilean navy. France influenced Chile's legal and educational systems, with French style architecture dominating the capital in the boom years at the turn of the 20th century. German influence came from the organization and training of the army by Prussians.

Since the late 19th century, Chilean military and foreign policy has been shaped by the maximum neighbor hypothesis, which holds that in the event of a conflict with a neighbor, the other two would join against Chile. This consideration has led to Chile historically pursuing a strong military deterrence; balanced bilateral relations with neighbors; and strong ties with countries outside the region.

On 26 June 1945, Chile participated as a founding member of the United Nations being among 50 countries that signed the United Nations Charter in San Francisco, California. With the military coup of 1973, Chile became isolated politically as a result of widespread human rights abuses.

Since its return to democracy in 1990, Chile has been an active participant in the international political arena. Chile completed a two-year non-permanent position on the UN Security Council in January 2005. Jose Miguel Insulza, a Chilean national, was elected Secretary General of the Organization of American States in May 2005 and confirmed in his position, being re-elected in 2009. Chile is currently serving on the International Atomic Energy Agency (IAEA) Board of Governors, and the 2007–2008 chair of the board is Chile's ambassador to the IAEA, Milenko E. Skoknic. The country is an active member of the UN family of agencies and participates in UN peacekeeping activities. It was re-elected as a member of the UN Human Rights Council in 2011 for a three-year term. It was also elected to one of five non-permanent seats on the UN Security Council in 2013. Chile hosted the Defense Ministerial of the Americas in 2002 and the APEC summit and related meetings in 2004. It also hosted the Community of Democracies ministerial in April 2005 and the Ibero-American Summit in November 2007. An associate member of Mercosur and a full member of APEC, Chile has been a major player in international economic issues and hemispheric free trade.

=== Military ===
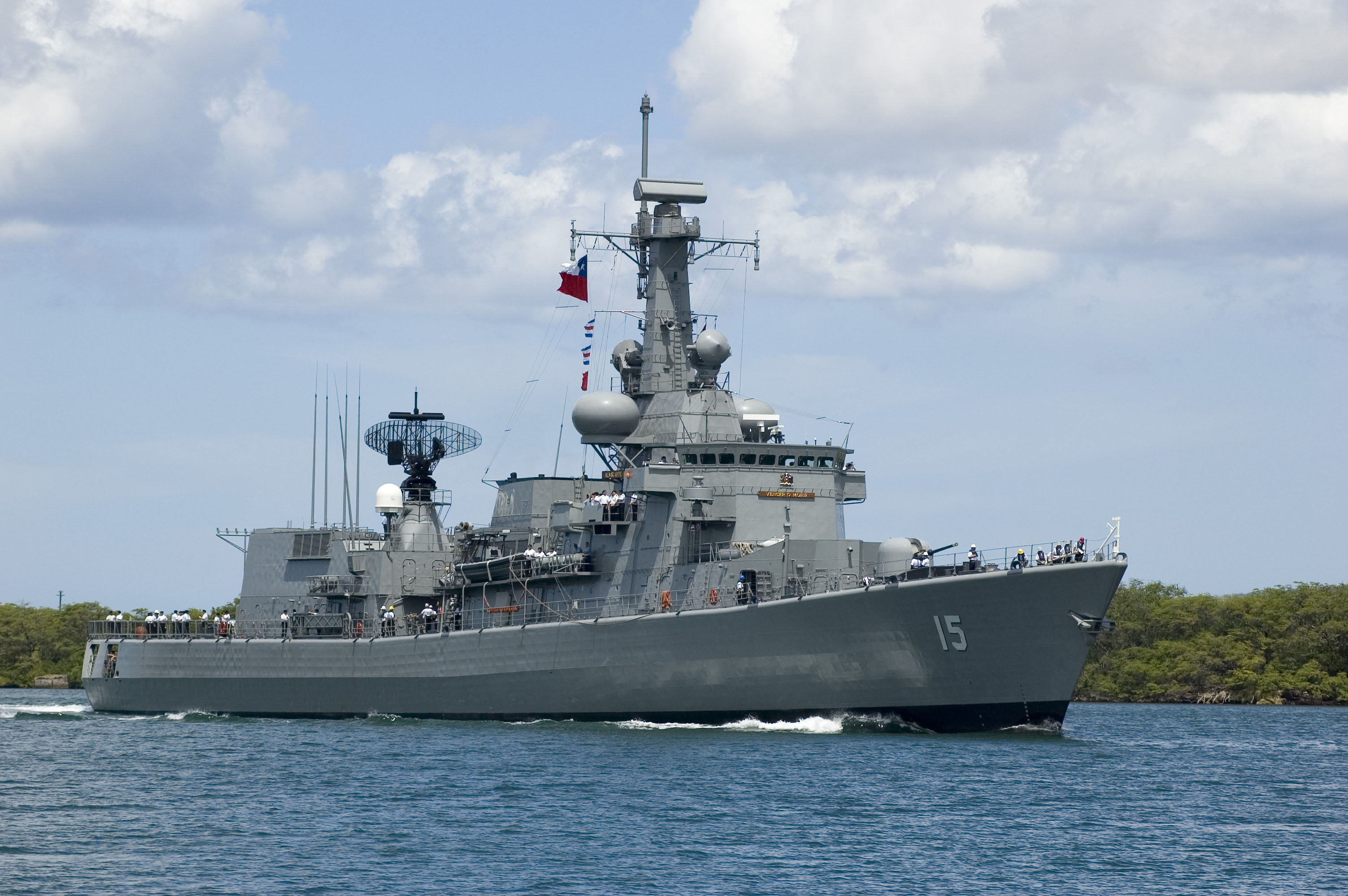
Karel Doorman-class frigate of Chilean Navy

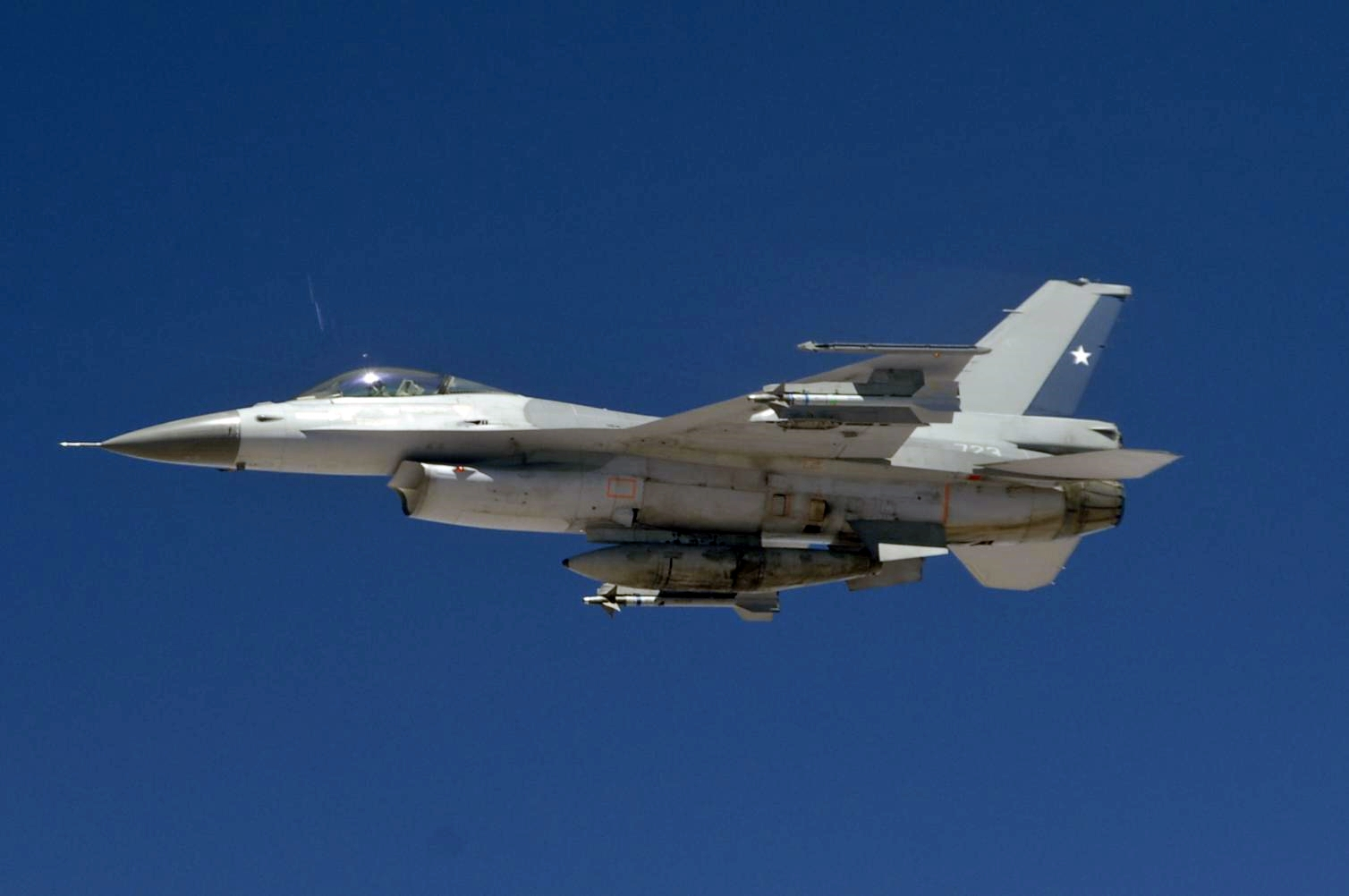
F-16 Fighting Falcon of Chilean Air Force

The Armed Forces of Chile are subject to civilian control exercised by the president through the Minister of Defense. The president has the authority to remove the commanders-in-chief of the armed forces.

The commander-in-chief of the Chilean Army is Army General Javier Iturriaga del Campo. The Chilean Army is 45,000 strong and is organized with an Army headquarters in Santiago, six divisions throughout its territory, an Air Brigade in Rancagua, and a Special Forces Command in Colina. The Chilean Army is one of the most professional and technologically advanced armies in Latin America.

Admiral Julio Leiva Molina directs the around 25,000-person Chilean Navy, including 2,500 Marines. Of the fleet of 29 surface vessels, only eight are operational major combatants (frigates). Those ships are based in Valparaíso. The Navy operates its own aircraft for transport and patrol; there are no Navy fighter or bomber aircraft. The Navy also operates four submarines based in Talcahuano.

Air Force General (four-star) Jorge Rojas Ávila heads the 12,500-strong Chilean Air Force. Air assets are distributed among five air brigades headquartered in Iquique, Antofagasta, Santiago, Puerto Montt, and Punta Arenas. The Air Force also operates an airbase on King George Island, Antarctica. The Air Force took delivery of the final two of ten F-16s, all purchased from the U.S., in March 2007 after several decades of U.S. debate and previous refusal to sell. Chile also took delivery in 2007 of a number of reconditioned Block 15 F-16s from the Netherlands, bringing to 18 the total of F-16s purchased from the Dutch.

After the military coup in September 1973, the Chilean national police (Carabineros) were incorporated into the Defense Ministry. With the return of democratic government, the police were placed under the operational control of the Interior Ministry but remained under the nominal control of the Defense Ministry. Gen. Gustavo González Jure is the head of the national police force of 40,964 men and women who are responsible for law enforcement, traffic management, narcotics suppression, border control, and counter-terrorism throughout Chile.

In 2017, Chile signed the UN treaty on the Prohibition of Nuclear Weapons.

Chile is the 62nd most peaceful country in the world, according to the 2025 Global Peace Index.

=== National symbols ===
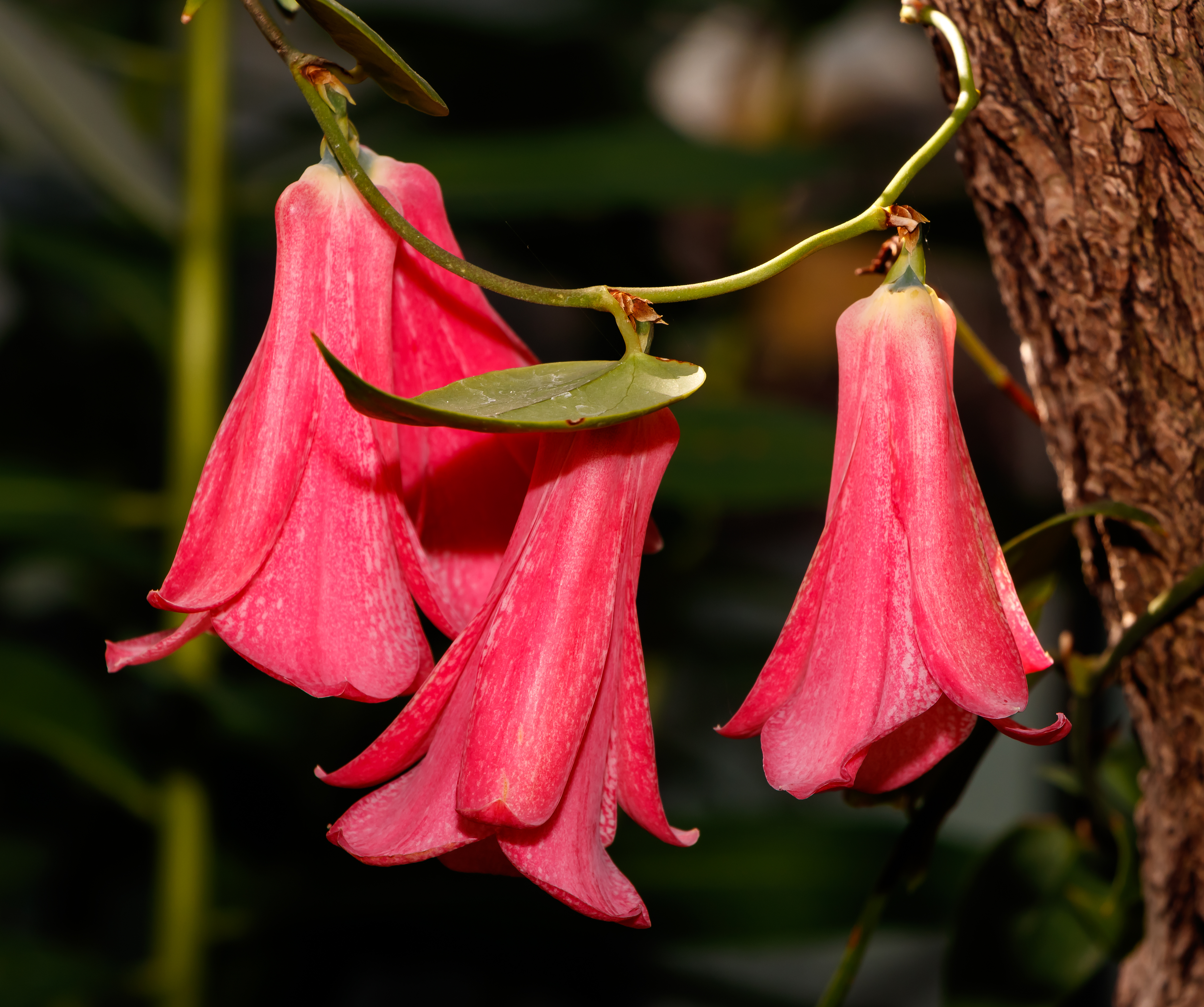
Lapageria rosea is endemic to Chile and it was officially declared the national flower on 24 February 1977

The national flower is the copihue (Lapageria rosea, Chilean bellflower), which grows in the woods of southern Chile.

The coat of arms depicts the two national animals: the condor (Vultur gryphus, a very large bird that lives in the mountains) and the huemul (Hippocamelus bisulcus, an endangered white tail deer). It also has the legend Por la razón o la fuerza (By reason or by force). Contrary to popular belief, although the condor and the huemul are featured on Chile’s coat of arms, neither they nor the araucaria tree have been designated as national symbols by law; however, all of them have been declared natural monuments.

The flag of Chile consists of two equal horizontal bands of white (top) and red; there is a blue square the same height as the white band at the hoist-side end of the white band; the square bears a white five-pointed star in the center representing a guide to progress and honor; blue symbolizes the sky, white is for the snow-covered Andes, and red stands for the blood spilled to achieve independence. The flag of Chile is similar to the Flag of Texas, although the Chilean flag is 21 years older. However, like the Texan flag, the flag of Chile is modeled after the flag of the United States.

Likewise, other national symbols have been officially recognized through decrees. The cueca has been the national dance since 1979. Lapis lazuli, a gemstone extracted in northern Chile, was declared the national stone in 1984; combarbalite, a semi-precious ornamental stone abundant in the Combarbalá area, was likewise declared a national stone in 1993. On the other hand, through an official memorandum, Chilean rodeo has been considered a national sport since 1962, while rayuela was recognized as a national sport and as a “cultural and heritage symbol of the Nation” in 2014.

== Economy ==
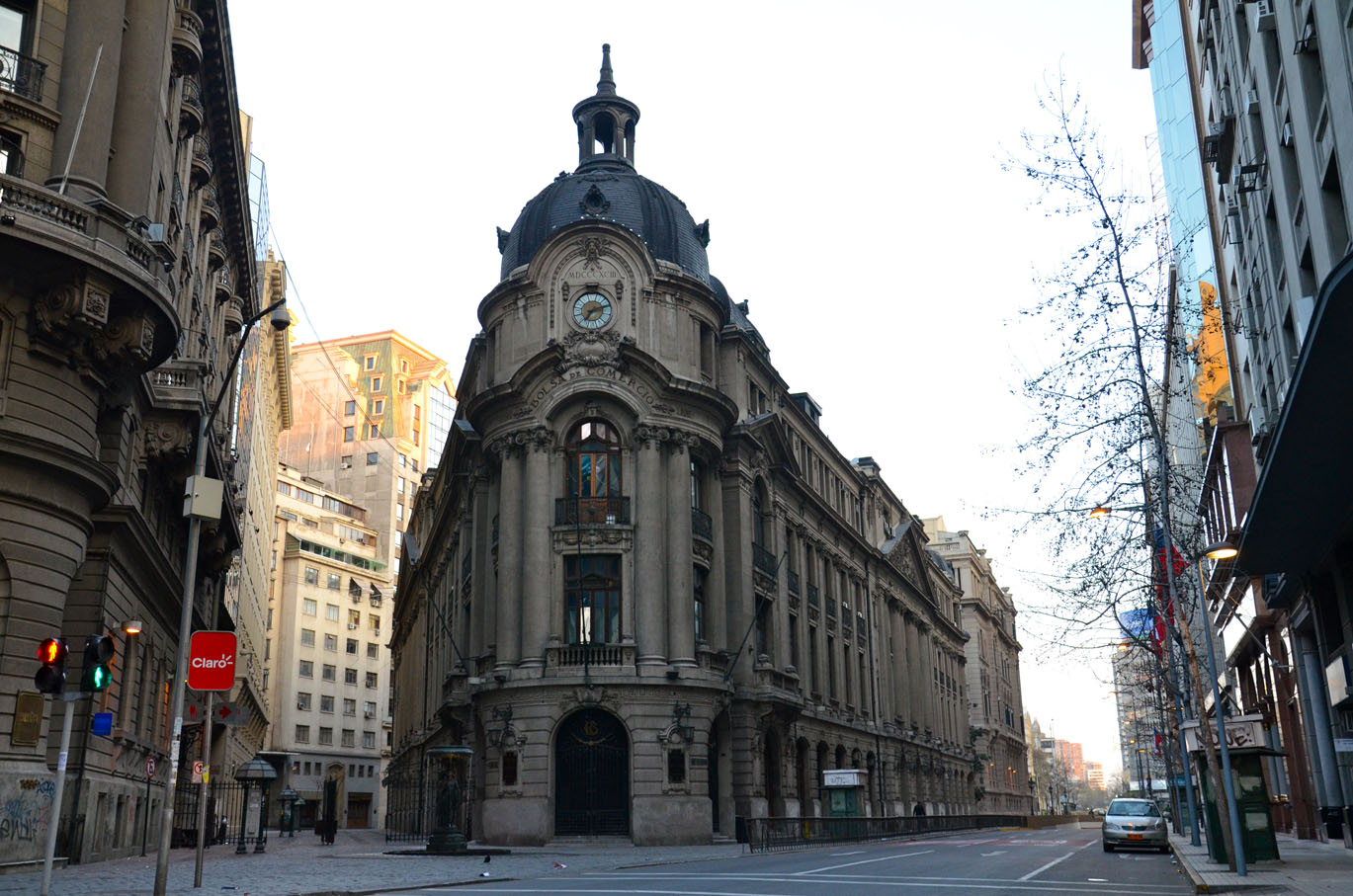
Santiago Stock Exchange

The Central Bank of Chile in Santiago serves as the central bank for the country. The Chilean currency is the Chilean peso (CLP). Chile is one of South America's most stable and prosperous nations, leading Latin American nations in human development, competitiveness, globalization, economic freedom, and low perception of corruption. Since July 2013, Chile is considered by the World Bank as a "high-income economy".

In May 2010 Chile became the first South American country to join the OECD. In 2006, Chile became the country with the highest nominal GDP per capita in Latin America. As of 2020, Chile ranks third in Latin America (behind Uruguay and Panama) in nominal GDP per capita.

Copper mining makes up 20% of Chilean GDP and 60% of exports. Escondida is the largest copper mine in the world, producing over 5% of global supplies. Overall, Chile produces a third of the world's copper. Codelco, the state mining firm, competes with private copper mining companies.

Sound economic policies, maintained consistently since the 1980s, have contributed to steady economic growth in Chile and have more than halved poverty rates. Chile began to experience a moderate economic downturn in 1999. The economy remained sluggish until 2003, when it began to show clear signs of recovery, achieving 4.0% GDP growth. The Chilean economy finished 2004 with growth of 6%. Real GDP growth reached 5.7% in 2005 before falling back to 4% in 2006. GDP expanded by 5% in 2007. Faced with the 2008 financial crisis, the government announced an economic stimulus plan to spur employment and growth, and despite the Great Recession, aimed for an expansion of between 2% and 3% of GDP for 2009. Nonetheless, economic analysts disagreed with government estimates and predicted economic growth at a median of 1.5%. Real GDP growth in 2012 was 5.5%. Growth slowed to 4.1% in the first quarter of 2013.

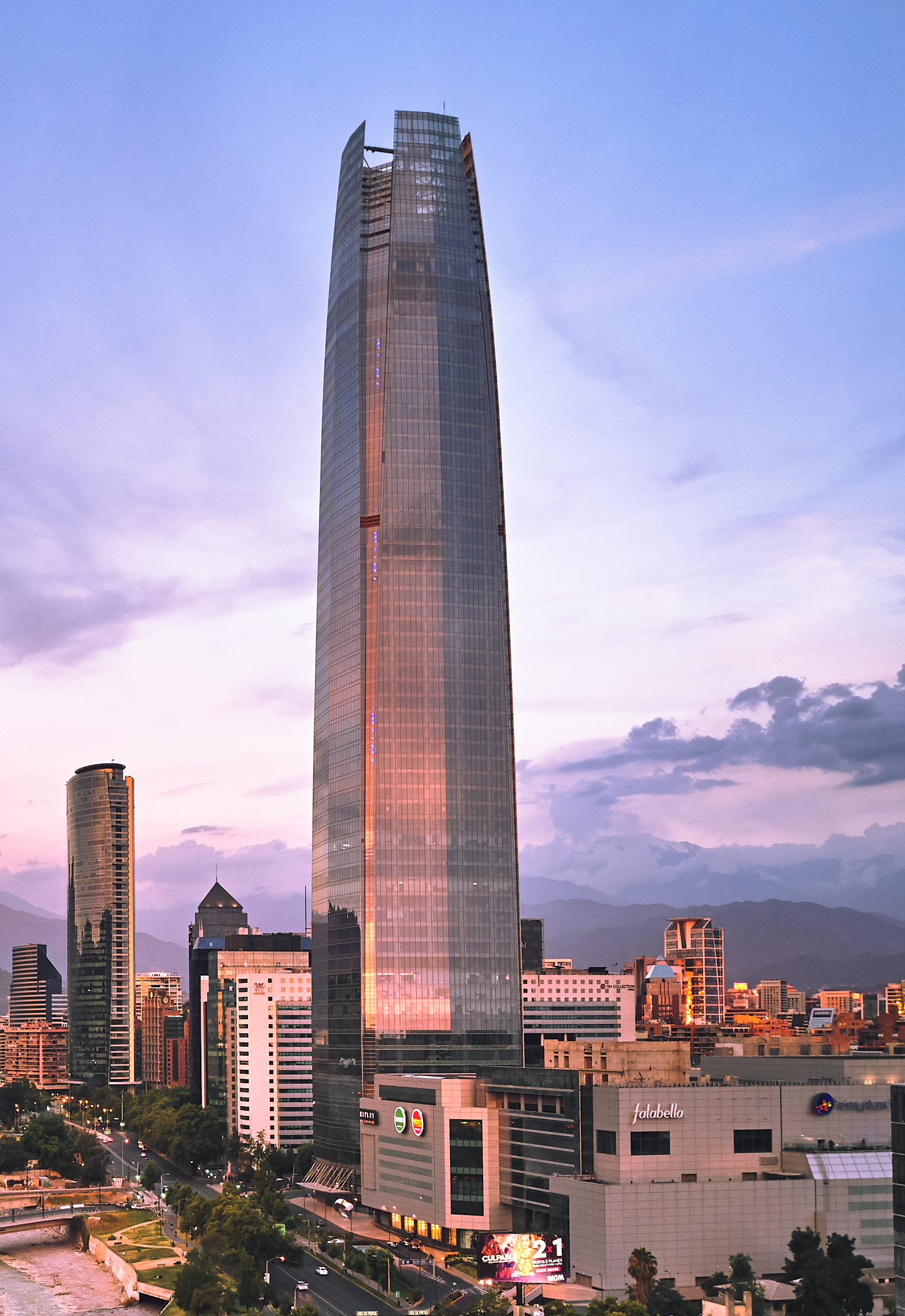
Gran Torre Costanera and Titanium La Portada (background) skyscrapers in Sanhattan

The unemployment rate was 9.1% in 2024, according to The World Bank. There are reported labor shortages in agriculture, mining, and construction. The percentage of Chileans with per capita household incomes below the poverty line—defined as twice the cost of satisfying a person's minimal nutritional needs—fell from 45.1% in 1987 to 11.5% in 2009, according to government surveys. Critics in Chile, however, argue that true poverty figures are considerably higher than those officially published. Using the relative yardstick favoured in many European countries, 27% of Chileans would be poor, according to Juan Carlos Feres of the ECLAC.

As of early 2025, about 85% of Chileans benefit from government welfare programs, via the "Social Protection Card" or "Registro Social de Hogares" (RSH), which includes the population living in poverty and those at a risk of falling into poverty. The privatized national pension system (AFP) has encouraged domestic investment and contributed to an estimated total domestic savings rate of approximately 21% of GDP. Under the compulsory private pension system, most formal sector employees pay 10% of their salaries into privately managed funds.

Chile has signed free trade agreements (FTAs) with a whole network of countries, including an FTA with the United States that was signed in 2003 and implemented in January 2004. Internal Government of Chile figures show that even when factoring out inflation and the recent high price of copper, bilateral trade between the U.S. and Chile has grown over 60% since then. Chile's total trade with China reached US$8.8 billion in 2006, representing nearly 66% of the value of its trade relationship with Asia. Exports to Asia increased from US$15.2 billion in 2005 to US$19.7 billion in 2006, a 29.9% increase. Year-on-year growth of imports was especially strong from a number of countries: Ecuador (123.9%), Thailand (72.1%), South Korea (52.6%), and China (36.9%).

Chile's approach to foreign direct investment is codified in the country's Foreign Investment Law. Registration is reported to be simple and transparent, and foreign investors are guaranteed access to the official foreign exchange market to repatriate their profits and capital. The Chilean Government has formed a Council on Innovation and Competition, hoping to bring in additional FDI to new parts of the economy.

Standard & Poor's gives Chile a credit rating of A. The Government of Chile has a GDP debt of 43.3% at the end of 2025. The Chilean central government is a net creditor with a net asset position of 7% of GDP at end 2012. The current account deficit was 4% in the first quarter of 2013, financed mostly by foreign direct investment. 14% of central government revenue came directly from copper in 2012. Chile was ranked 51st in the Global Innovation Index in 2025.

=== Mineral resources ===
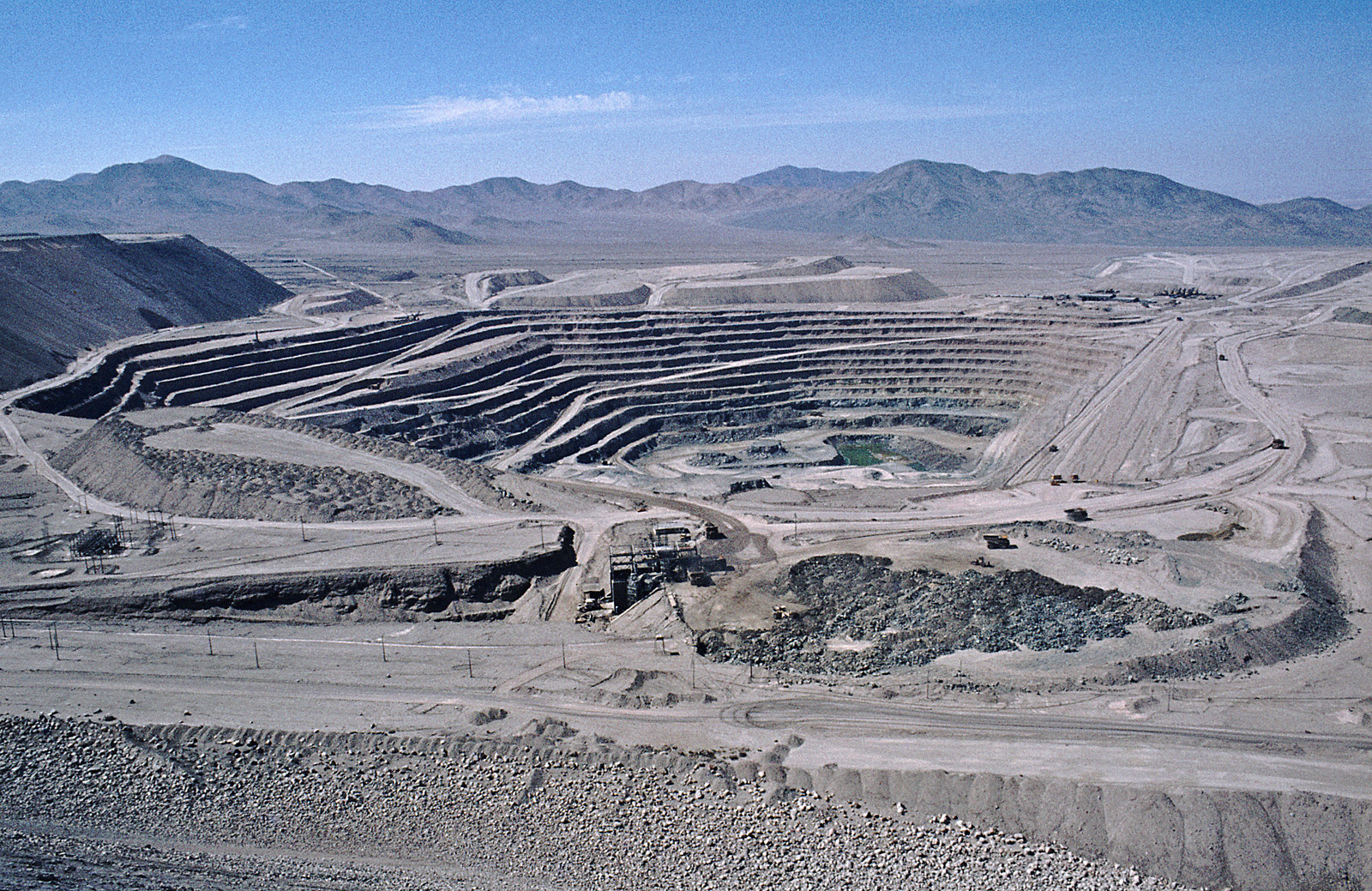
Chuquicamata, the largest open pit copper mine in the world

Chile is rich in mineral resources, especially copper and lithium. It is thought that due to the importance of lithium for batteries for electric vehicles and stabilization of electric grids with large proportions of intermittent renewables in the electricity mix, Chile could be strengthened geopolitically. However, this perspective has also been criticized for underestimating the power of economic incentives for expanded production in other parts of the world.

The country was, in 2019, the world's largest producer of copper, iodine and rhenium, the second largest producer of lithium and molybdenum, the sixth largest producer of silver, the seventh largest producer of salt, the eighth largest producer of potash, the thirteenth producer of sulfur and the thirteenth producer of iron ore in the world. In 2023, it was fourth largest silver producer globally. The country also has considerable gold production: between 2006 and 2017, the country produced annual amounts ranging from 35.9 tonnes in 2017 to 51.3 tonnes in 2013, where the gold production in 2015 is 43 metric tonnes.

=== Agriculture ===
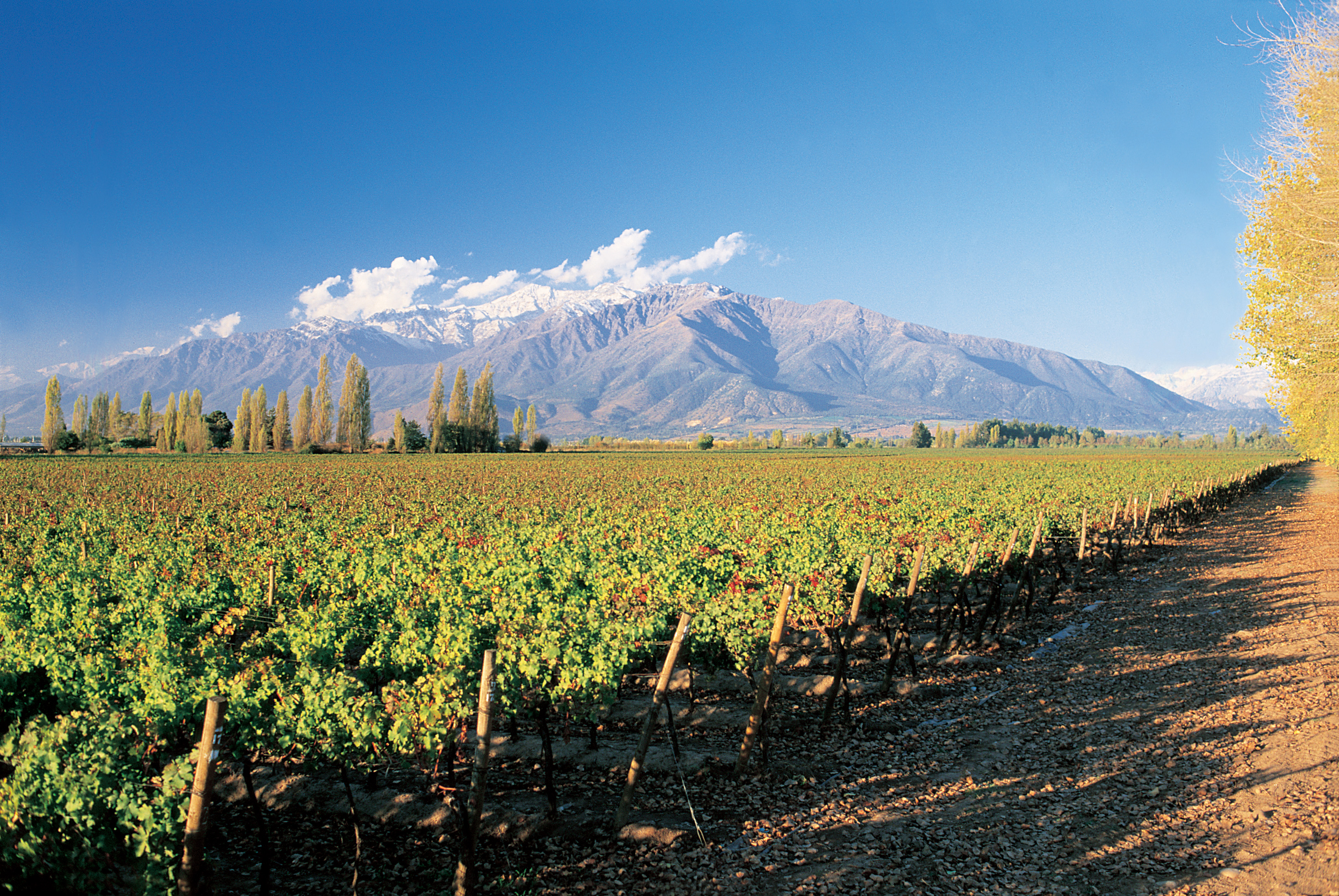
Vineyard in Puente Alto

Agriculture in Chile encompasses a wide range of different activities due to its particular geography, climate and geology and human factors. Historically agriculture is one of the bases of Chile's economy. Now agriculture and allied sectors like forestry, logging and fishing account for only 4.9% of the GDP as of 2007 and employ 13.6% of the country's labor force. Chile is one of the 5 largest world producers of cherry and blueberry, and one of the 10 largest world producers of grape, apple, kiwi, peach, plum and hazelnut, focusing on exporting high-value fruits. Some other major agriculture products of Chile include pears, onions, wheat, maize, oats, garlic, asparagus, beans, beef, poultry, wool, fish, timber and hemp. Due to its geographical isolation and strict customs policies Chile is free from diseases and pests such as mad cow disease, fruit fly and Phylloxera. This, its location in the Southern Hemisphere, which has quite different harvesting times from the Northern Hemisphere, and its wide range of agriculture conditions are considered Chile's main comparative advantages. However, Chile's mountainous landscape limits the extent and intensity of agriculture so that arable land corresponds only to 2.62% of the total territory. Chile currently utilizes 14,015 Hectares of agricultural land.

Chile is the world's second largest producer of salmon, after Norway. In 2019, it was responsible for 26% of the global supply. In wine, Chile is usually among the 10 largest producers in the world. In 2018 it was in 6th place.

=== Tourism ===
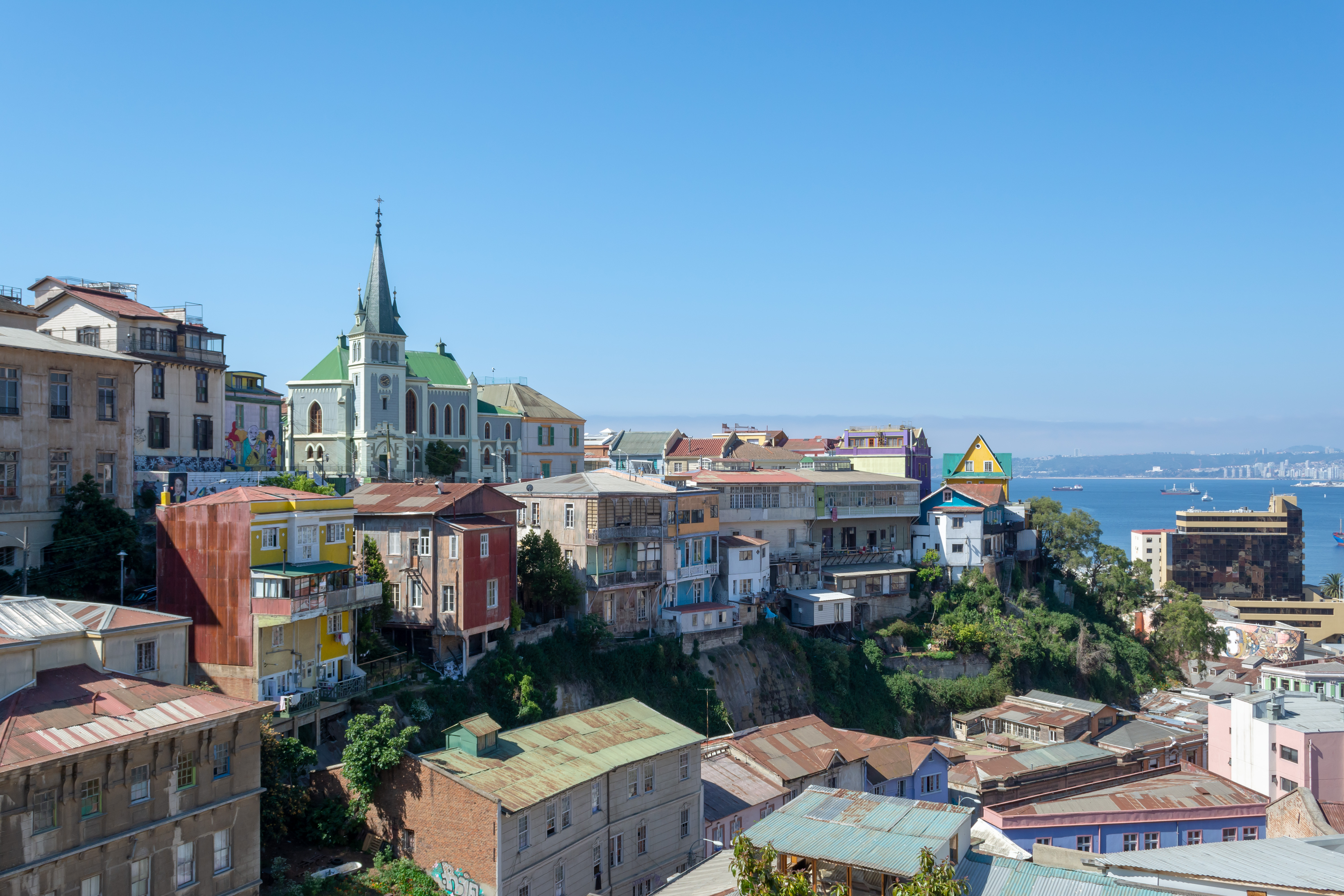
Valparaíso City, a UNESCO World Heritage Site

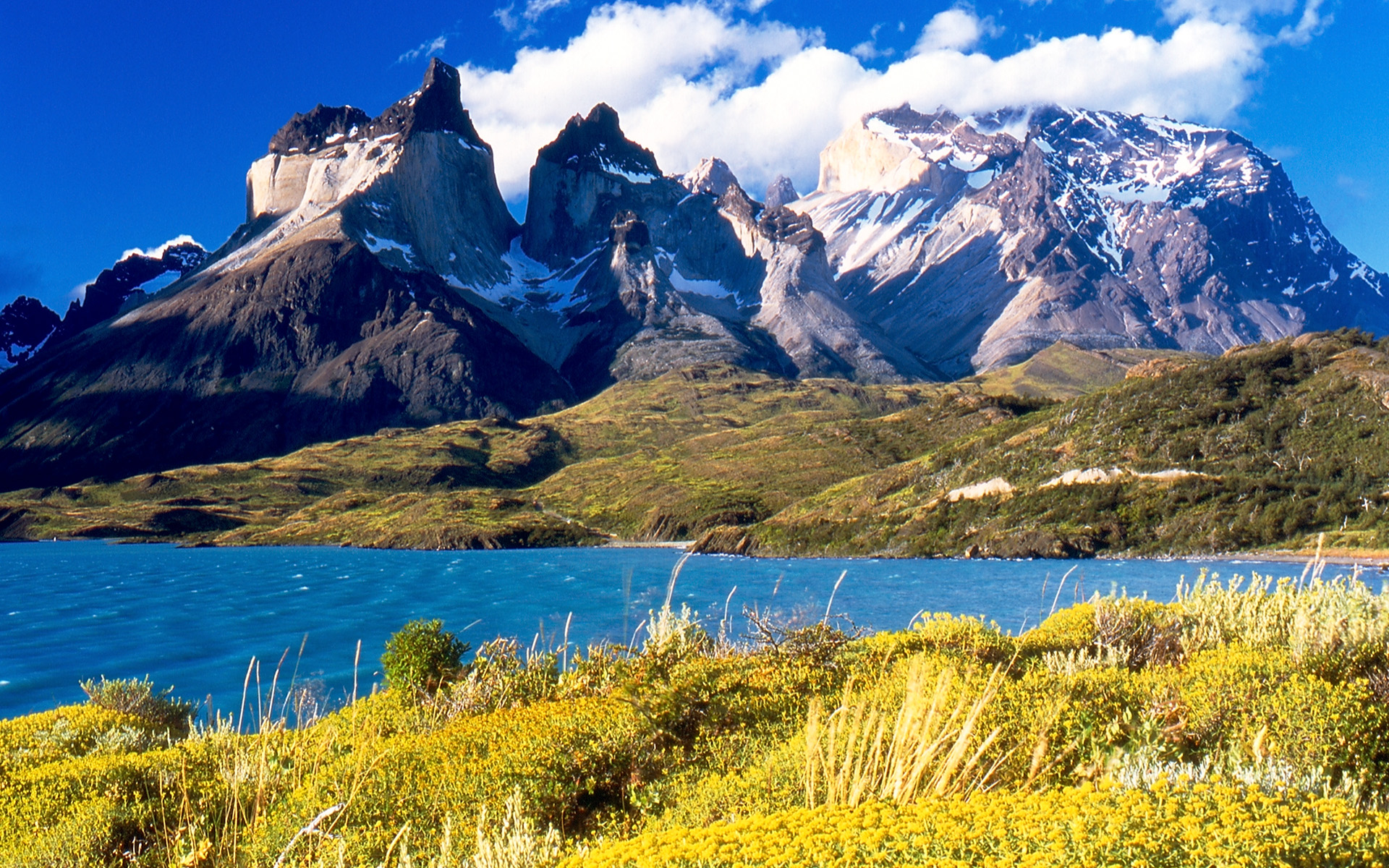
Torres del Paine National Park in Chilean Patagonia

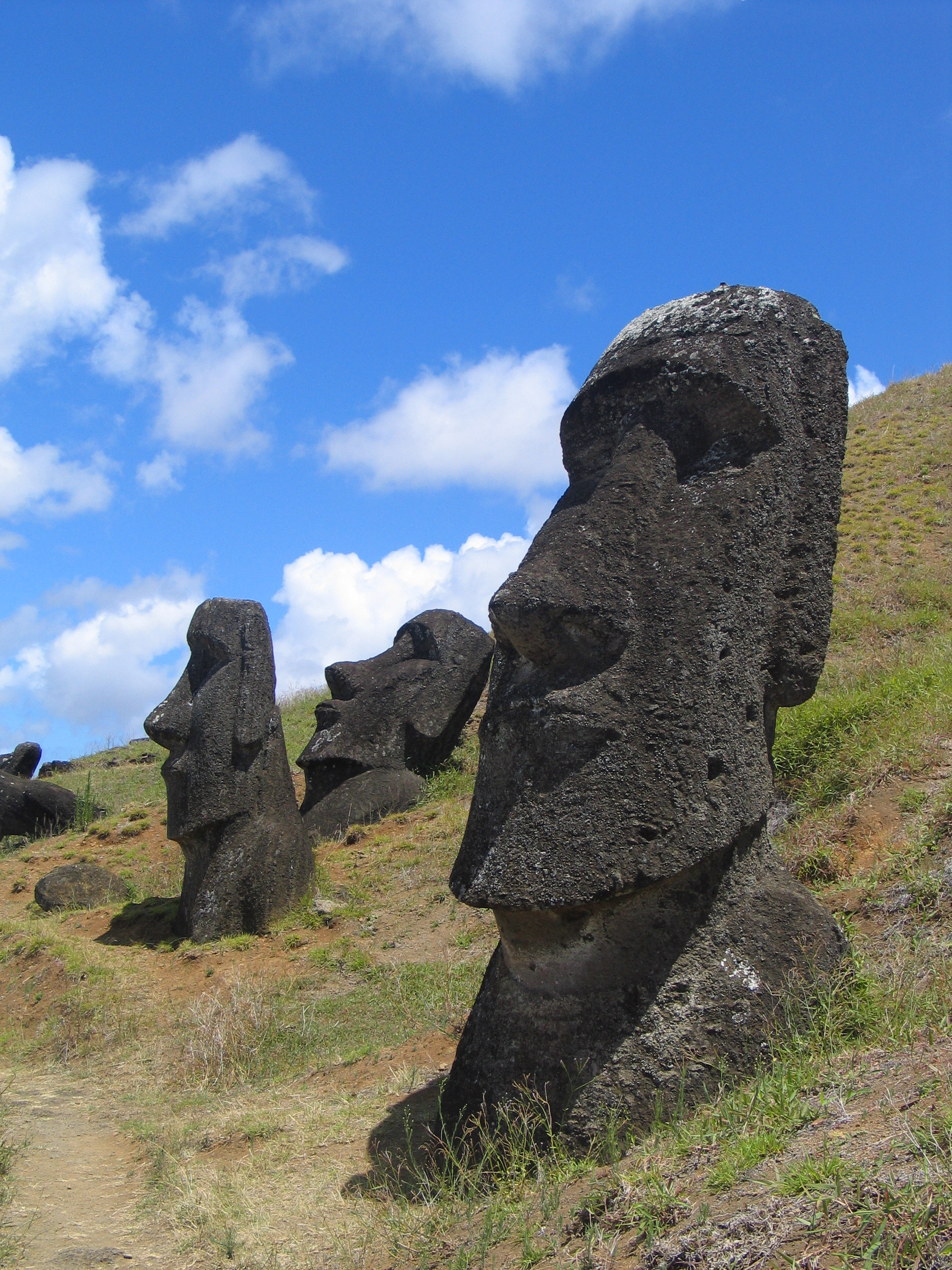
Pre-Columbian Moais, human figures dated between 1250 and 1500 in the Easter Island

Tourism in Chile has experienced sustained growth over the last few decades. In 2005, tourism grew by 13.6%, generating more than 4.5 billion dollars of which 1.5 billion was attributed to foreign tourists. According to the National Service of Tourism (Sernatur), 2 million people a year visit the country. Most of these visitors come from other countries in the American continent, mainly Argentina; followed by a growing number from the United States, Europe, and Brazil with a growing number of Asians from South Korea and China.

The main attractions for tourists are places of natural beauty situated in the extreme zones of the country: San Pedro de Atacama, in the north, is very popular with foreign tourists who arrive to admire the Incaic architecture, the altiplano lakes, and the Valley of the Moon. In Putre, also in the north, there is the Chungará Lake, as well as the Parinacota and the Pomerape volcanoes, with altitudes of 6,348 m and 6,282 m, respectively. Throughout the central Andes there are many ski resorts of international repute, including Portillo, Valle Nevado and Termas de Chillán.

The main tourist sites in the south are national parks (the most popular is Conguillío National Park in the Araucanía) and the coastal area around Tirúa and Cañete with the Isla Mocha and the Nahuelbuta National Park, Chiloé Archipelago and Patagonia, which includes Laguna San Rafael National Park, with its many glaciers, and the Torres del Paine National Park. The central port city of Valparaíso, which is World Heritage with its unique architecture, is also popular. Finally, Easter Island in the Pacific Ocean is one of the main Chilean tourist destinations.

For locals, tourism is concentrated mostly in the summer (December to March), and mainly in the coastal beach towns. Arica, Iquique, Antofagasta, La Serena and Coquimbo are the main summer centers in the north, and Pucón on the shores of Lake Villarrica is the main center in the south. Because of its proximity to Santiago, the coast of the Valparaíso Region, with its many beach resorts, receives the largest number of tourists. Viña del Mar, Valparaíso's more affluent northern neighbor, is popular because of its beaches, casino, and its annual song festival, the most important musical event in Latin America. Pichilemu in the O'Higgins Region is widely known as South America's "best surfing spot" according to Fodor's.

In November 2005 the government launched a campaign under the brand "Chile: All Ways Surprising" intended to promote the country internationally for both business and tourism. Museums in Chile such as the Chilean National Museum of Fine Arts built in 1880, feature works by Chilean artists.

Chile is home to the world-renowned Patagonian Trail that resides on the border between Argentina and Chile. Chile recently launched a massive scenic route for tourism in hopes of encouraging development based on conservation. The Route of Parks covers 1,740 miles (2,800 km) and was designed by Tompkin Conservation (founders Douglas Tompkins and wife Kristine).

=== Transport ===
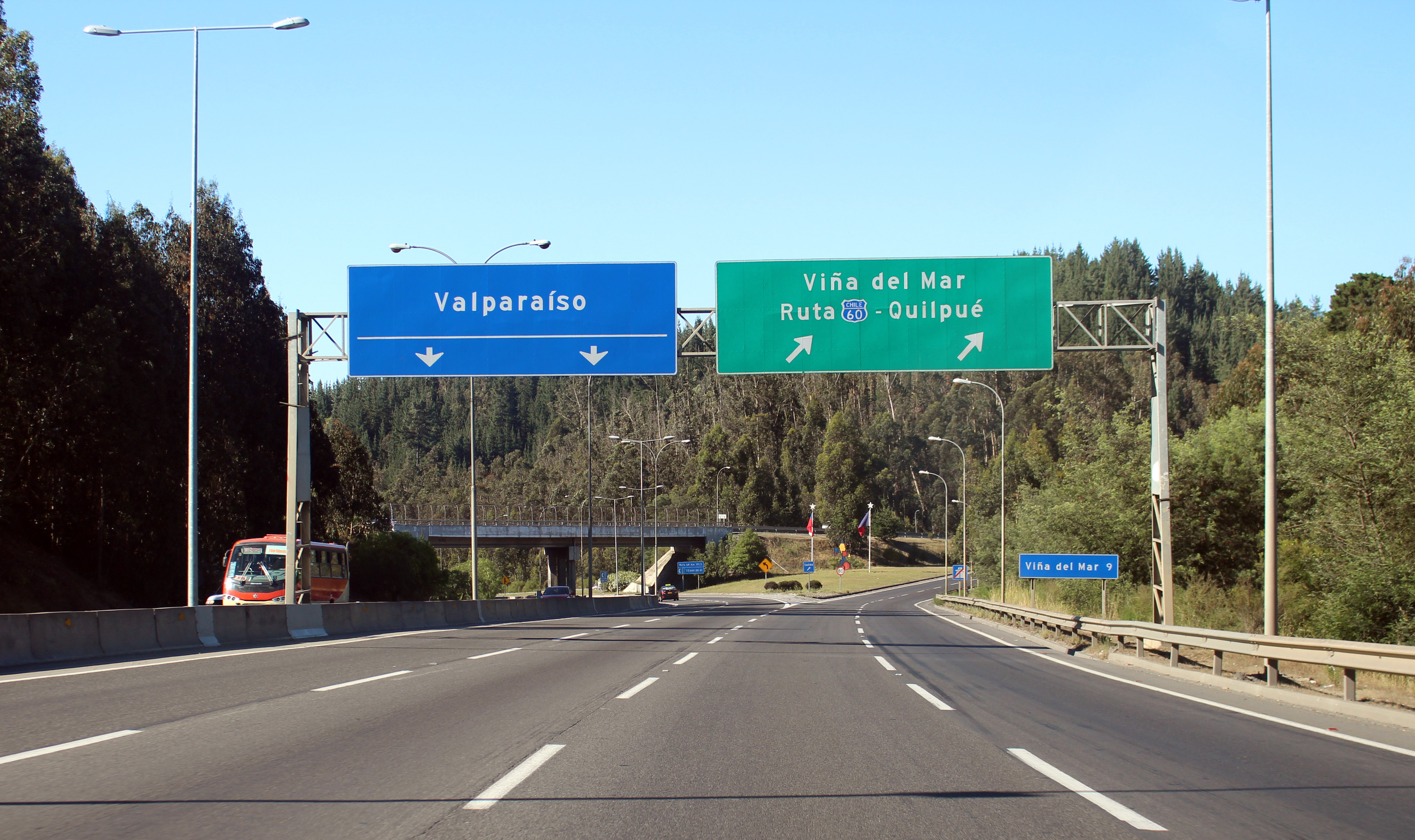
Route 68 at the junction with Route 60

Due to Chile's topography a functioning transport network is vital to its economy. In 2020, Chile had 85,984 km (53,428 mi) of highways, with 21,289 km (13,228 mi) paved. In the same year, the country had 3,347 km (2,080 mi) of duplicated highways, the second largest network in South America, after Brazil. Since the mid-1990s, there has been a significant improvement in the country's roads, through bidding processes that allowed the construction of an efficient road network, with emphasis on the duplication of continuous 1,950 km (1,212 mi) of the Panamerican Highway (Chile Route 5) between Puerto Montt and Caldera (in addition to the planned duplication in the Atacama Desert area), the excerpts in between Santiago, Valparaiso and the Central Coast, and the northern access to Concepción and the large project of the Santiago urban highways network, opened between 2004 and 2006. Buses are now the main means of long-distance transportation in Chile, following the decline of its railway network. The bus system covers the entire country, from Arica to Santiago (a 30-hour journey) and from Santiago to Punta Arenas (about 40 hours, with a change at Osorno).

Chile has a total of 372 runways (62 paved and 310 unpaved). Important airports in Chile include Chacalluta International Airport (Arica), Diego Aracena International Airport (Iquique), Andrés Sabella Gálvez International Airport (Antofagasta), Carriel Sur International Airport (Concepción), El Tepual International Airport (Puerto Montt), Presidente Carlos Ibáñez del Campo International Airport (Punta Arenas), La Araucanía International Airport (Temuco), Mataveri International Airport (Easter Island), the most remote airport in the world, as defined by distance to another airport, and the Arturo Merino Benítez International Airport (Santiago) with a traffic of 26,254,957 passengers in 2024. Santiago is headquarters of Latin America's largest airline holding company and Chilean flag carrier LATAM Airlines.

=== Internet and telecommunications ===
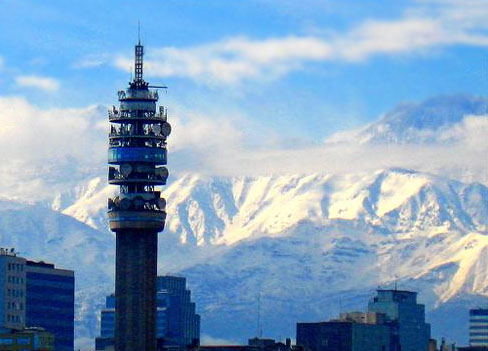
Torre Entel in Santiago de Chile, with the Andes Mountains in the background

Chile has a telecommunication system which covers much of the country, including Chilean insular and Antarctic bases. Privatization of the telephone system began in 1988; Chile has one of the most advanced telecommunications infrastructure in South America with a modern system based on extensive microwave radio relay facilities and a domestic satellite system with 3 earth stations. In 2012, there were 3.276 million main lines in use and 24.13 million mobile cellular telephone subscribers.

According to a 2024 database of the International Telecommunication Union (ITU), 95.6% of the Chilean population uses the internet, making Chile the country with the highest internet penetration in South America.

In 1993, the first web server in Latin America was installed in Chile. The Chilean internet country code ".cl" was created in 1987; by the end of March 2026, the number of registered domains had reached 734,314. In 2017 the government of Chile launched its first cyber security strategy, which receives technical support from the Organization of American States (OAS) Cyber Security Program of the Inter-American Committee against Terrorism (CICTE).

=== Energy ===
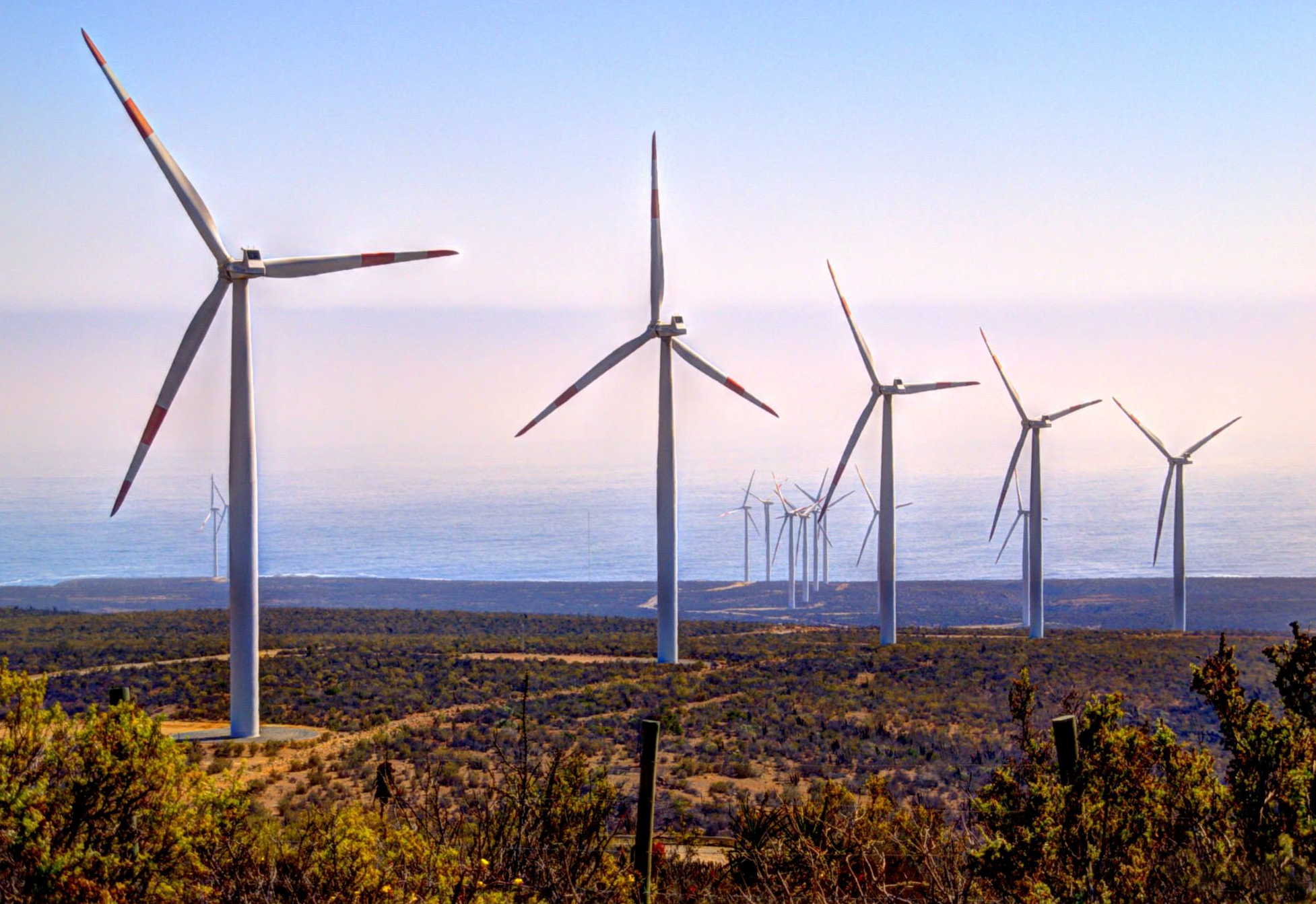
Wind farm near Canela, Chile

Chile's total energy supply (TES) was 23.0GJ per capita in 2020. Energy in Chile is dominated by fossil fuels, with coal, oil and gas accounting for 73.4% of the total primary energy. Biofuels and waste account for another 20.5% of primary energy supply, with the rest sourced from hydro and other renewables.

Electricity consumption was 68.90 TWh in 2014. Main sources of electricity in Chile are hydroelectricity, gas, oil and coal. Renewable energy in the forms of wind and solar energy are also coming into use, encouraged by collaboration since 2009 with the United States Department of Energy. The electricity industry is privatized with ENDESA as the largest company in the field.

In 2021, Chile had, in terms of installed renewable electricity, 6,807 MW in hydropower (28th largest in the world), 3,137 MW in wind power (28th largest in the world), 4,468 MW in solar (22nd largest in the world), and 375 MW in biomass. As the Atacama Desert has the highest solar irradiation in the world, and Chile has always had problems obtaining oil, gas and coal (the country basically does not produce them, so it has to import them), renewable energy is seen as the solution for the country's shortcomings in the energy field.

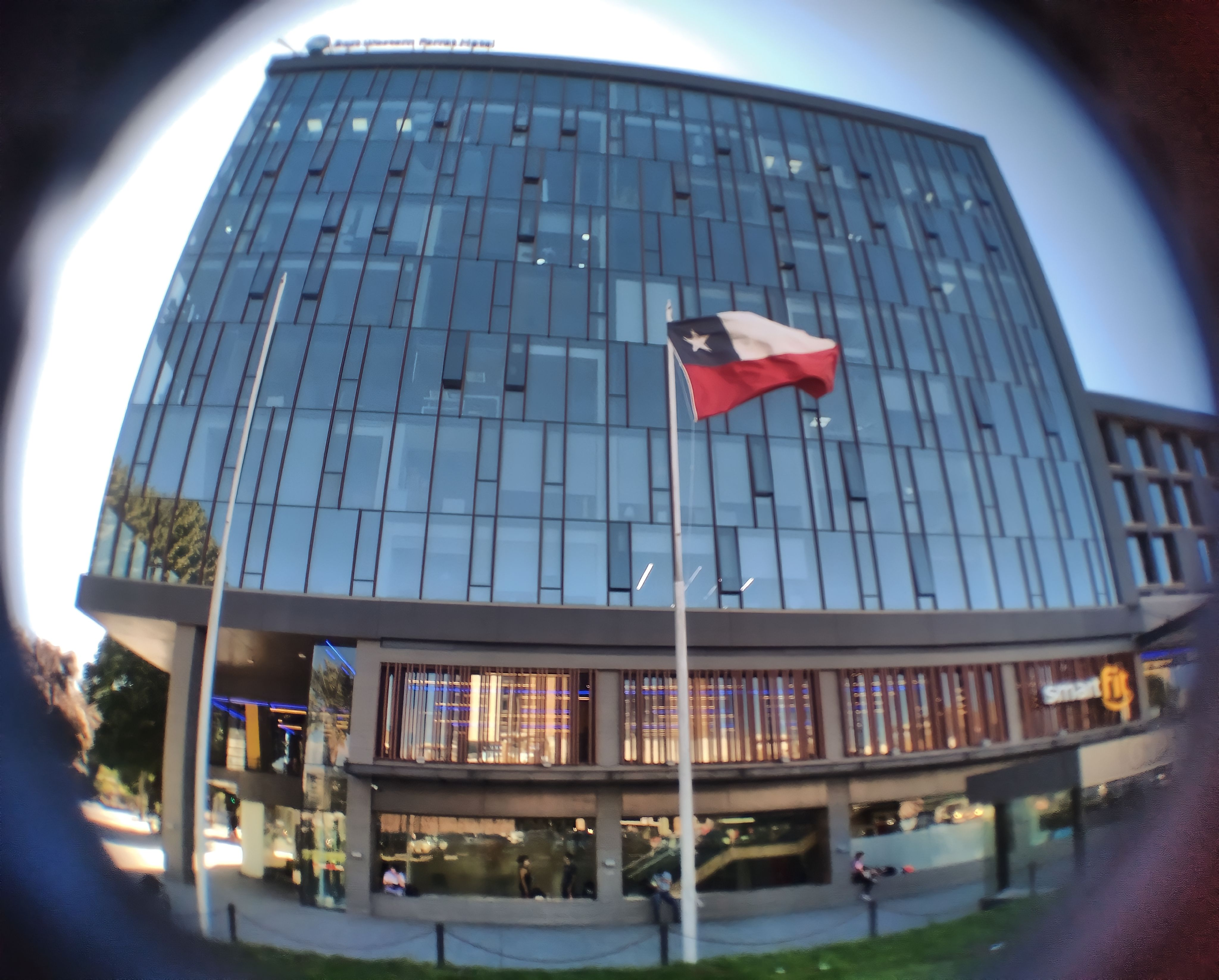
Paseo de las Artes Building in Temuco

In 2023 Chile emitted 107.99 million tonnes of greenhouse gases, equivalent to around 0.2% of the global total. In recent years Chile has emerged as a global leader in clean energy, particularly solar and wind. and has committed to net zero by 2050. According to Climate Action Tracker, the nation is making "considerable progress" in climate action by expanding renewables and phasing-out coal.

== Demographics ==
Chile's 2024 census reported an enumerated population of 18,480,432. Its rate of population growth has been decreasing since 1990, due to a declining birth rate. By 2050 the population is expected to reach approximately 20.2 million people.

=== Urbanization ===
About 85% of the country's population lives in urban areas, with 40% living in Greater Santiago. The largest agglomerations according to the 2002 census are Greater Santiago with 5.6 million people, Greater Concepción with 861,000 and Greater Valparaíso with 824,000.

Largest cities or towns in Chile 2002 Census
Rank	Name	Region	Pop.
1	Santiago Metropolis	Santiago Metropolitan Region	5,428,590
2	Greater Valparaíso	Valparaíso Region	803,683
3	Greater Concepción	Biobío Region	666,381
4	Greater La Serena	Coquimbo Region	296,253
5	Antofagasta	Antofagasta Region	285,255
6	Greater Temuco	Araucanía Region	260,878
7	Rancagua conurbation	O'Higgins Region	236,363
8	Talca	Maule Region	191,154
9	Arica	Arica and Parinacota Region	175,441
10	Chillán conurbation	Ñuble Region	165,528

=== Ancestry and ethnicity ===
Racial groups in Chile (2024 census)
1. Undeclared (87.7%)
2. Indigenous (11.4%)
3. Blacks (0.94%)

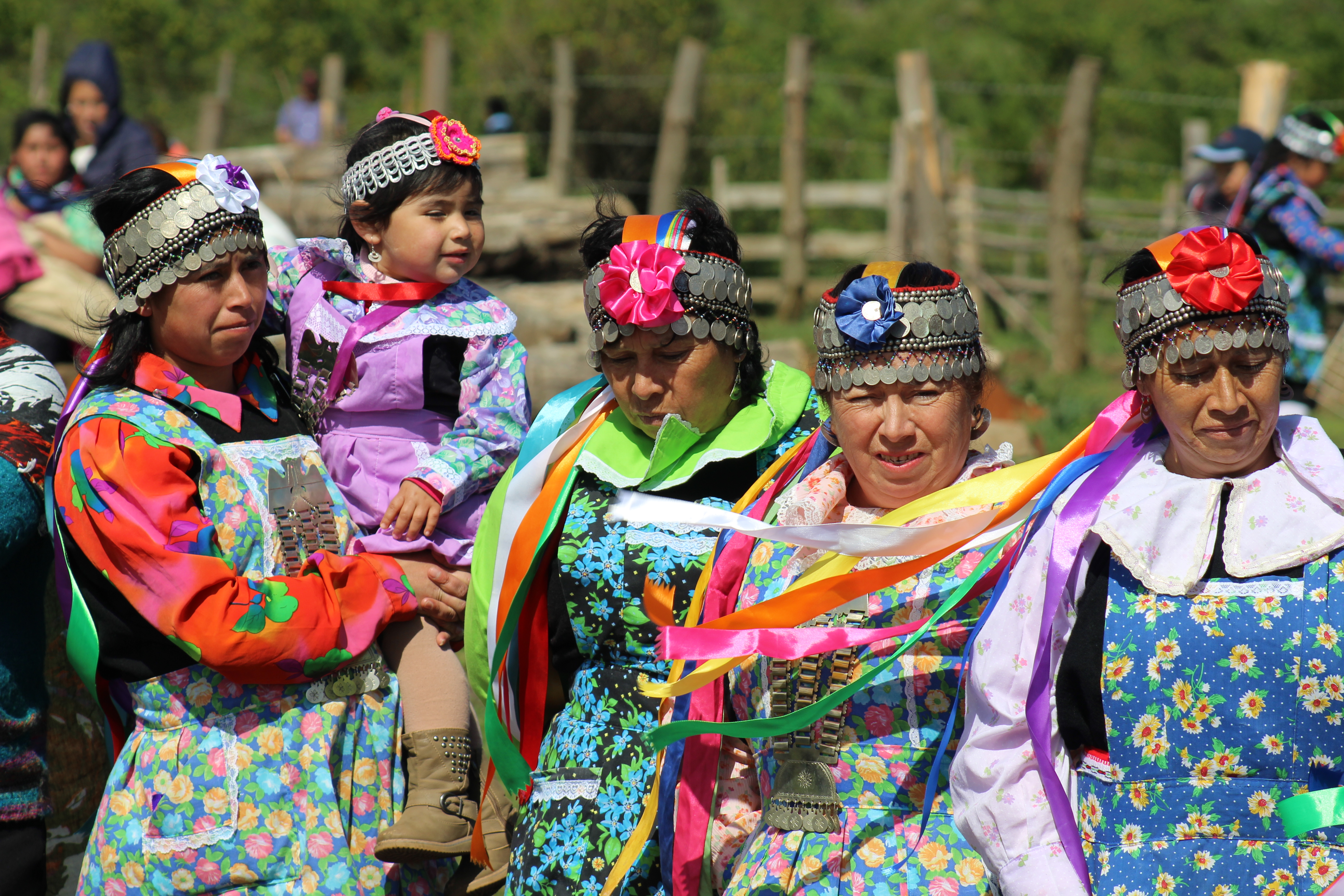
Mapuche women of Tirúa

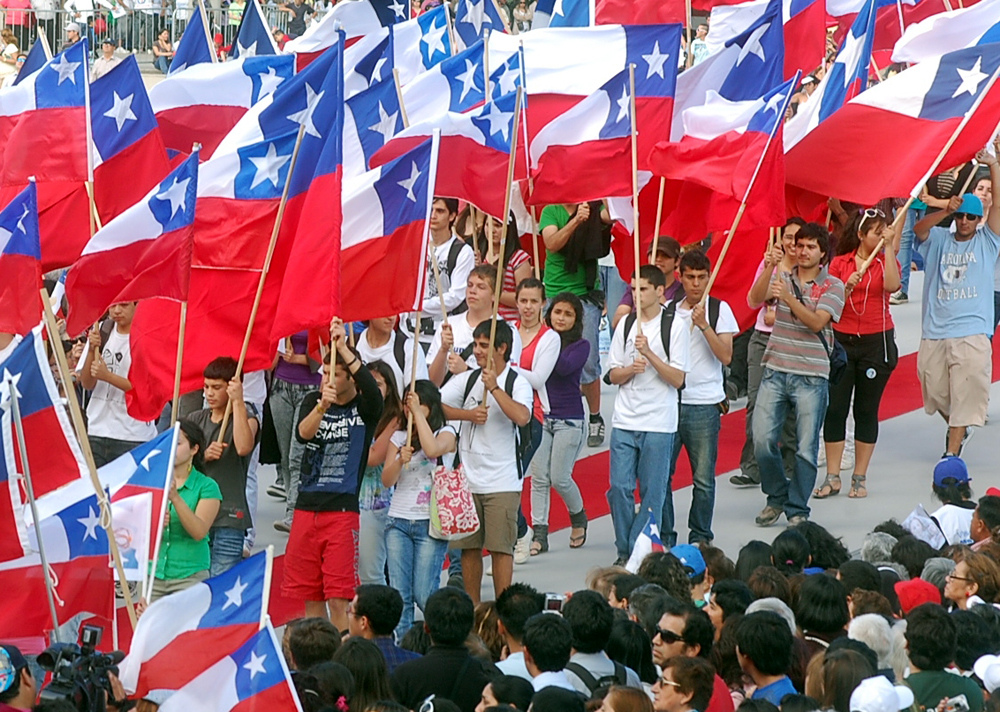
Chileans with flags of Chile

Mexican professor Francisco Lizcano, of the National Autonomous University of Mexico, estimated that 52.7% of Chileans were white, 39.3% were mestizo, and 8% were Amerindian. According to the Encyclopædia Britannica, as of the year 2002, only 22% of Chileans were white and 72% were mestizo.

In 1984, a study from the Revista de Pediatría de Chile titled Sociogenetic Reference Framework for Public Health Studies in Chile determined an ancestry of 67.9% European, and 32.1% Native American. In 1994, a biological study determined that the Chilean composition was 64% European and 35% Amerindian. The recent study in the Candela Project establishes that the genetic composition of Chile is 52% of European origin, with 44% of the genome coming from Native Americans (Amerindians), and 4% coming from Africa, making Chile a primarily mestizo country with traces of African descent present in half of the population. Another genetic study conducted by the University of Brasília in several South American countries shows a similar genetic composition for Chile, with a European contribution of 51.6%, an Amerindian contribution of 42.1%, and an African contribution of 6.3%. In 2015, another study established genetic composition in 57% European, 38% Native American, and 2.5% African.

A public health booklet from the University of Chile states that 30% of the population is of Caucasian origin; "predominantly White" Mestizos are estimated to amount to a total of 65%, while Native Americans (Amerindians) comprise the remaining 5%.

Despite the genetic considerations, many Chileans, if asked, would self-identify as White. The 2011 Latinobarómetro survey asked respondents in Chile what race they considered themselves to belong to. Most answered "White" (59%), while 25% said "Mestizo" and 8% self-classified as "indigenous". A 2002 national poll revealed that a majority of Chileans believed they possessed some (43.4%) or much (8.3%) "indigenous blood", while 40.3% responded that they had none.

Chile is one of 22 countries to have signed and ratified the only binding international law concerning indigenous peoples, the Indigenous and Tribal Peoples Convention, 1989. It was adopted in 1989 as the International Labour Organization (ILO) Convention 169. Chile ratified it in 2008. A Chilean court decision in November 2009, considered to be a landmark ruling on indigenous rights, made use of the convention. The Supreme Court decision on Aymara water rights upheld rulings by both the Pozo Almonte tribunal and the Iquique Court of Appeals and marks the first judicial application of ILO Convention 169 in Chile.

The earliest European immigrants were Spanish colonizers who arrived in the 16th century. The Amerindian population of central Chile was absorbed into the Spanish settler population in the beginning of the colonial period to form the large mestizo population that exists in Chile today; mestizos create modern middle and lower classes. In the 18th and 19th centuries, many Basques came to Chile where they integrated into the existing elites of Castilian origin. Postcolonial Chile was never a particularly attractive destination for migrants, owing to its remoteness and distance from Europe. Europeans preferred to stay in countries closer to their homelands instead of taking the long journey through the Straits of Magellan or crossing the Andes. European migration did not result in a significant change in the ethnic composition of Chile, except in the region of Magellan. Spaniards were the only major European migrant group to Chile, and there was never large-scale immigration such as that to Argentina or Brazil. Between 1851 and 1924, Chile only received 0.5% of European immigration to Latin America, compared to 46% to Argentina, 33% to Brazil, 14% to Cuba, and 4% to Uruguay. However, it is undeniable that immigrants have played a significant role in Chilean society.

Immigrants to Chile during the 19th and 20th centuries came from France, Great Britain, Germany, and Croatia, among others. Descendants of different European ethnic groups often intermarried in Chile. This intermarriage and mixture of cultures and races have helped to shape the present society and culture of the Chilean middle and upper classes. Also, roughly 500,000 of Chile's population is of full or partial Palestinian origin, and 800,000 Arab descents. Chile currently has 1.5 million of Latin American immigrants, mainly from Venezuela, Peru, Haiti, Colombia, Bolivia and Argentina; 8% of the total population in 2019, without counting descendants. According to the 2002 national census, Chile's foreign-born population has increased by 75% since 1992. As of November 2021, numbers of people entering Chile from elsewhere in Latin America have grown swiftly in the last decade, tripling in the last three years to 1.5 million, with arrivals stemming from humanitarian crises in Haiti (ca. 180,000) and Venezuela (ca 460,000).

=== Languages ===
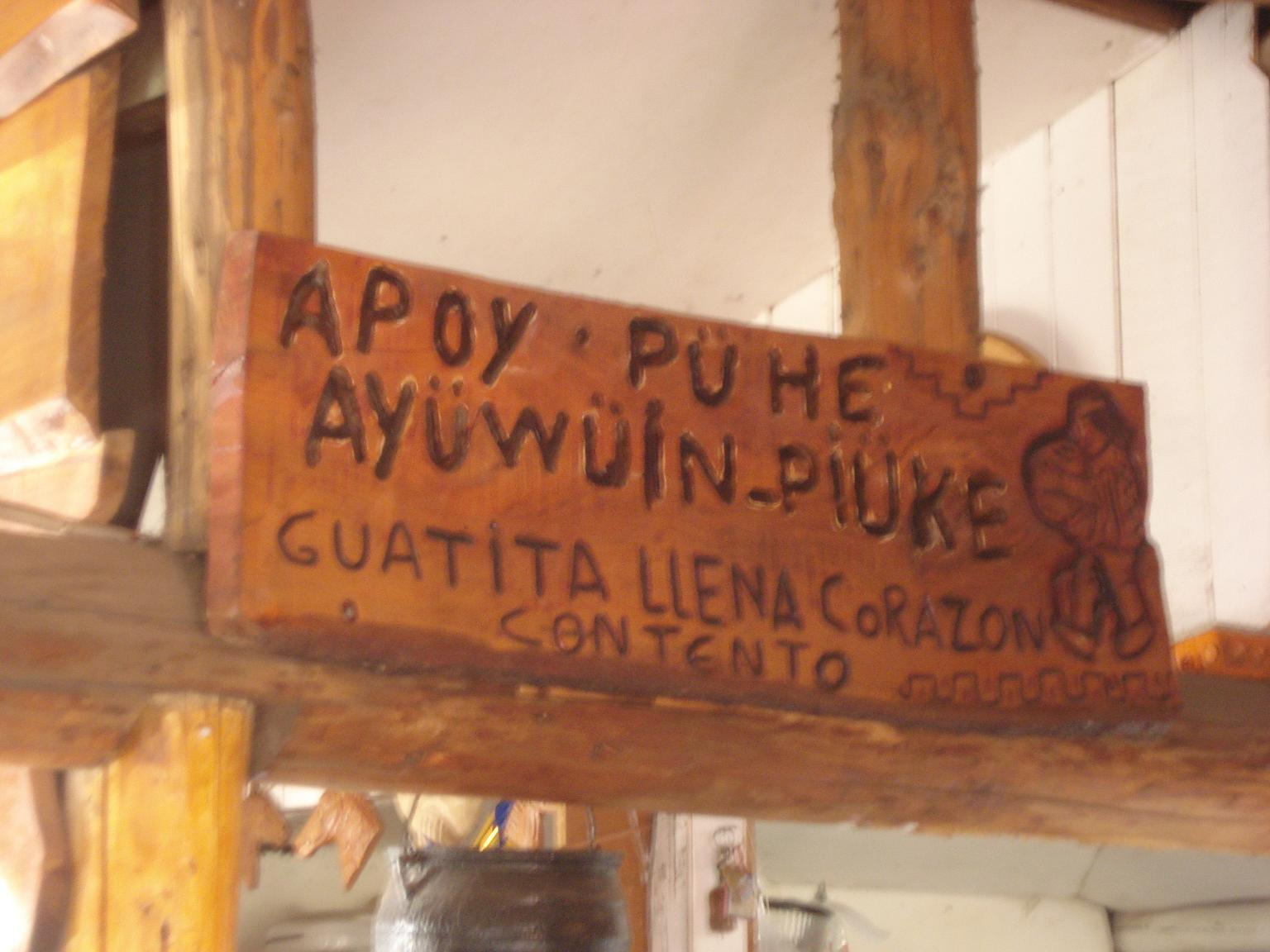
Chilean proverb written in Mapuche language and Chilean Spanish. The Mapudungun alphabet used here does not reflect an agreed-upon standard. In fact, there are three distinct alphabets currently used to write the Mapuche language.

The Spanish spoken in Chile is distinctively accented and quite unlike that of neighboring South American countries because final syllables are often dropped, and some consonants have a soft pronunciation. Accent varies only very slightly from north to south; more noticeable are the differences in accent based on social class or whether one lives in the city or the country. That the Chilean population was largely formed in a small section at the center of the country and then migrated in modest numbers to the north and south helps explain this relative lack of differentiation, which was maintained by the national reach of radio, and now television, which also helps to diffuse and homogenize colloquial expressions.

There are several indigenous languages spoken in Chile: Mapudungun, Aymara, Rapa Nui, Chilean Sign Language, and the critically-endangered Kawésqar language. Yaghan went extinct in 2022, following the death of its last native speaker, Cristina Calderón. Non-indigenous languages spoken in Chile include German, Italian, English, Greek, and South Bolivian Quechua. After the Spanish conquest, Spanish took over as the lingua franca and the indigenous languages have become minority languages, with some now extinct or close to extinction.

German is still spoken to some extent in southern Chile, either in small countryside pockets or as a second language among the communities of larger cities.

Through initiatives such as the English Opens Doors Program, the government made English mandatory for students in fifth grade and above in public schools. Most private schools in Chile start teaching English from kindergarten. Common English words have been absorbed and appropriated into everyday Spanish speech.

=== Religion ===
Religion in Chile (2024 Census)
Religion	Percent
Catholic Christianity	54.0%
Protestant Christianity	16.3%
Other Christians	2.8%
No religion	25.8%
Other religions	1.1%

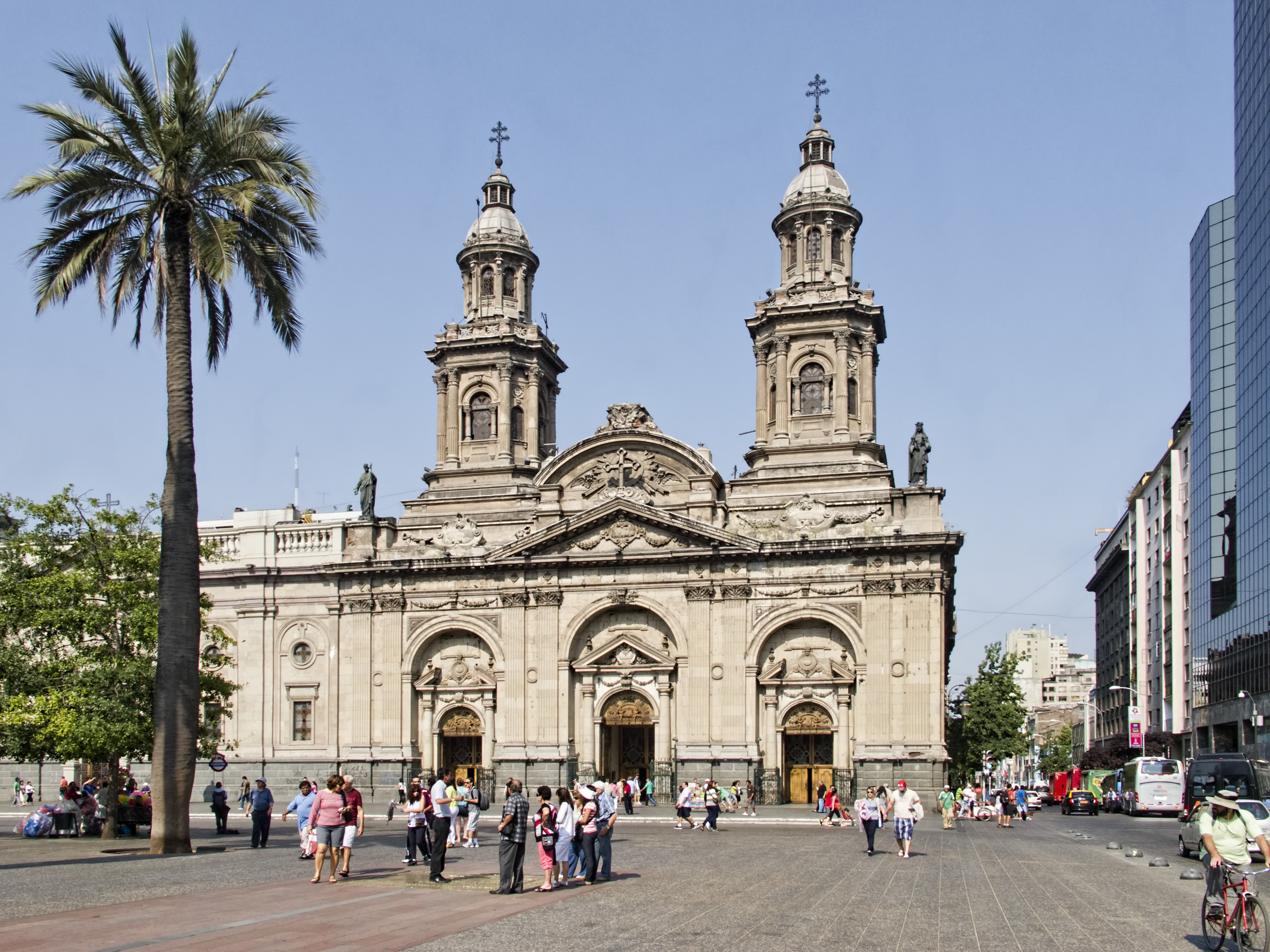
Santiago Metropolitan Cathedral, built between 1748 and 1906.

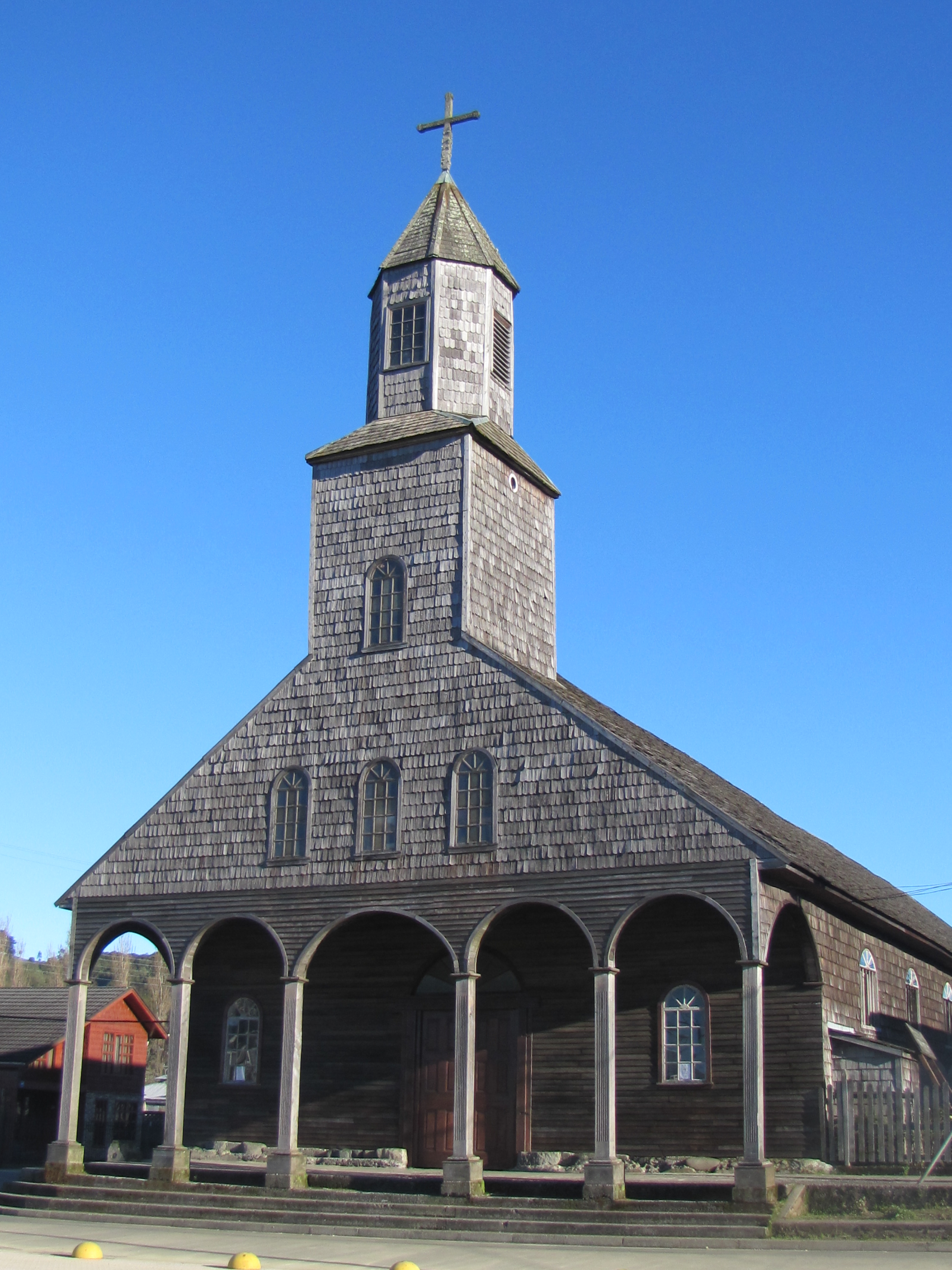
Church of Santa María de Loreto of Achao, built in the 18th century and now a UNESCO World Heritage site.

Historically, the indigenous peoples in Chile observed a variety of religions before the Spanish conquest in the 16th century. During Spanish rule and the first century of Chilean independence, the Catholic Church was one of the most powerful institutions in the country. In the late 19th century, liberal policies (the so-called Leyes laicas or "lay laws") started to reduce the influence of the clergy and the promulgation of a new Constitution in 1925 established the separation of church and state.

As of 2012, 66.6% of Chilean population over 15 years of age claimed to adhere to the Catholic Church, a decrease from the 70% reported in the 2002 census. In the same census of 2012, 17% of Chileans reported adherence to an Evangelical church ("Evangelical" in the census referred to all Christian denominations other than the Catholic and Orthodox—Greek, Persian, Serbian, Ukrainian, and Armenian—churches, the Church of Jesus Christ of Latter-day Saints, Seventh-day Adventists, and Jehovah's Witnesses: essentially, those denominations generally still termed "Protestant" in most English-speaking lands, although Adventism is often considered an Evangelical denomination as well). Approximately 90% of Evangelical Christians are Pentecostal. but Wesleyan, Lutheran, Anglican, Episcopalian, Presbyterian, other Reformed, Baptist, and Methodist churches also are present amongst Chilean Evangelical churches. Irreligious people, atheists, and agnostics account for around 12% of the population.

By 2015, the major religion in Chile remained Christianity (68%), with an estimated 55% of Chileans belonging to the Catholic Church, 13% to various Evangelical churches, and just 7% adhering to any other religion. Agnostics and atheist were estimated at 25% of the population.

According to the 2024 census, 53.7% of Chileans aged 15 years or older were Catholics, 25.7% had no religion, 16.2% were Protestants, and 3.8% professed another religion.

Chile has a Baháʼí religious community, and is home to the Baháʼí mother temple, or continental House of Worship, for Latin America. Completed in 2016, it serves as a space for people of all religions and backgrounds to gather, meditate, reflect, and worship. It is formed from cast glass and translucent marble and has been described as innovative in its architectural style.

The Constitution guarantees the right to freedom of religion, and other laws and policies contribute to generally free religious practice. The law at all levels fully protects this right against abuse by either governmental or private actors. Church and state are officially separate in Chile. A 1999 law on religion prohibits religious discrimination. However, the Catholic church for mostly historical and social reasons enjoys a privileged status and occasionally receives preferential treatment. Government officials attend Catholic events as well as major Evangelical Christian and Jewish ceremonies.

The Chilean government treats the religious holidays of Christmas, Good Friday, the Feast of the Virgin of Carmen, the Feast of Saints Peter and Paul, the Feast of the Assumption, All Saints' Day, and the Feast of the Immaculate Conception as national holidays. Recently, the government declared 31 October, Reformation Day, to be an additional national holiday, in honor of the Evangelical churches of the country.

The patron saints of Chile are Our Lady of Mount Carmel and Saint James the Greater (Santiago). In 2005, Pope Benedict XVI canonized Alberto Hurtado, who became the country's second native Roman Catholic saint after Teresa de los Andes.

=== Education ===
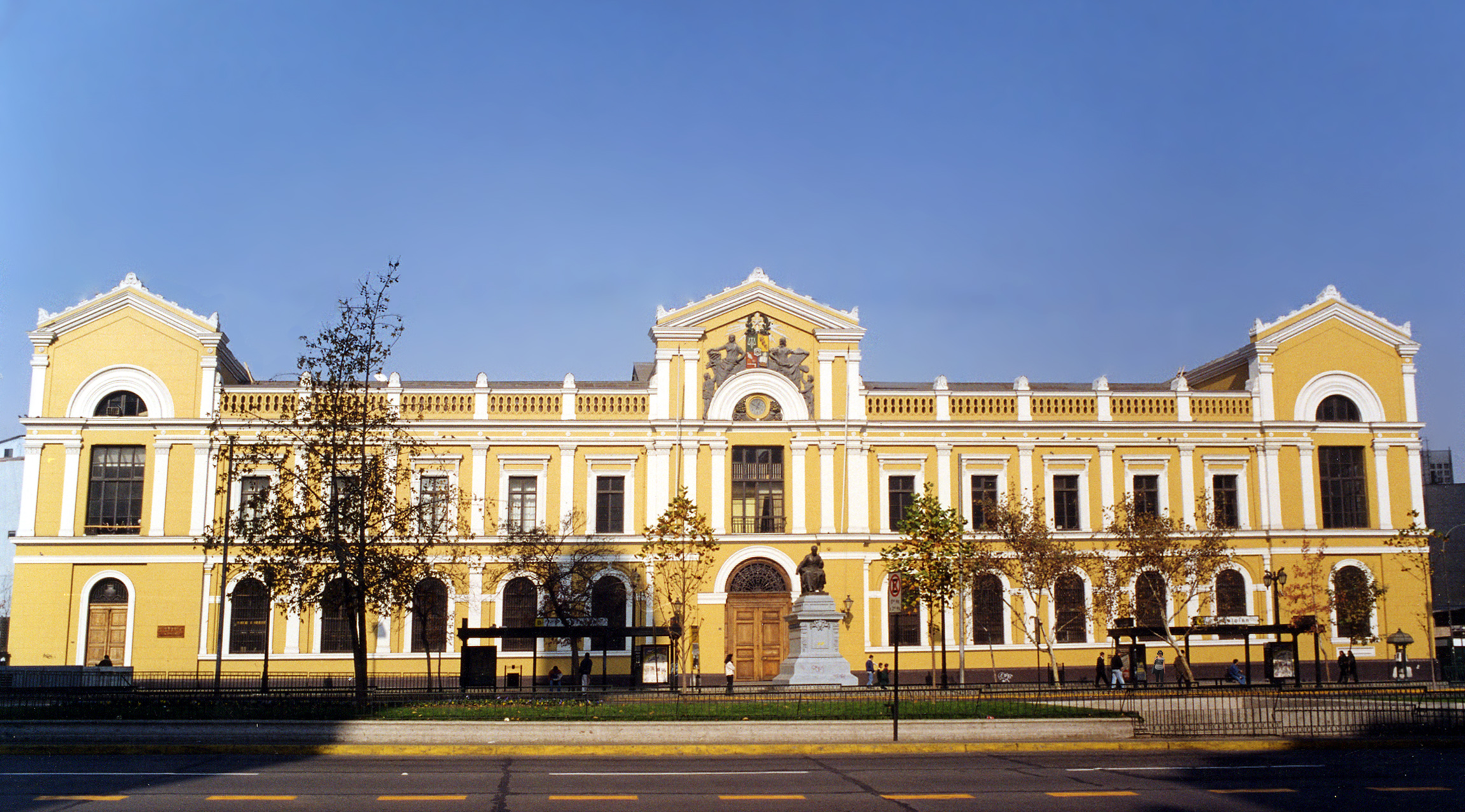
The Casa Central of the University of Chile in Santiago

In Chile, education begins with preschool until the age of 5. Primary school is provided for children between ages 6 and 13. Students then attend secondary school until graduation at age 17.

Secondary education is divided into two parts: During the first two years, students receive a general education. Then, they choose a branch: scientific humanistic education, artistic education, or technical and professional education. Secondary school ends two years later on the acquirement of a certificate (licencia de enseñanza media).

Chilean education is segregated by wealth in a three-tiered system – the quality of the schools reflects socioeconomic backgrounds:

- city schools (colegios municipales) that are mostly free and have the worst education results, mostly attended by poor students;
- subsidized schools that receive some money from the government which can be supplemented by fees paid by the student's family, which are attended by mid-income students and typically get mid-level results; and
- entirely private schools that consistently get the best results. Many private schools charge attendance fees of 0,5 to 1 median household income.

Upon successful graduation of secondary school, students may continue into higher education. The higher education schools in Chile consist of Chilean Traditional Universities and are divided into public universities or private universities. There are medical schools and both the Universidad de Chile and Universidad Diego Portales offer law schools in a partnership with Yale University.

=== Health ===
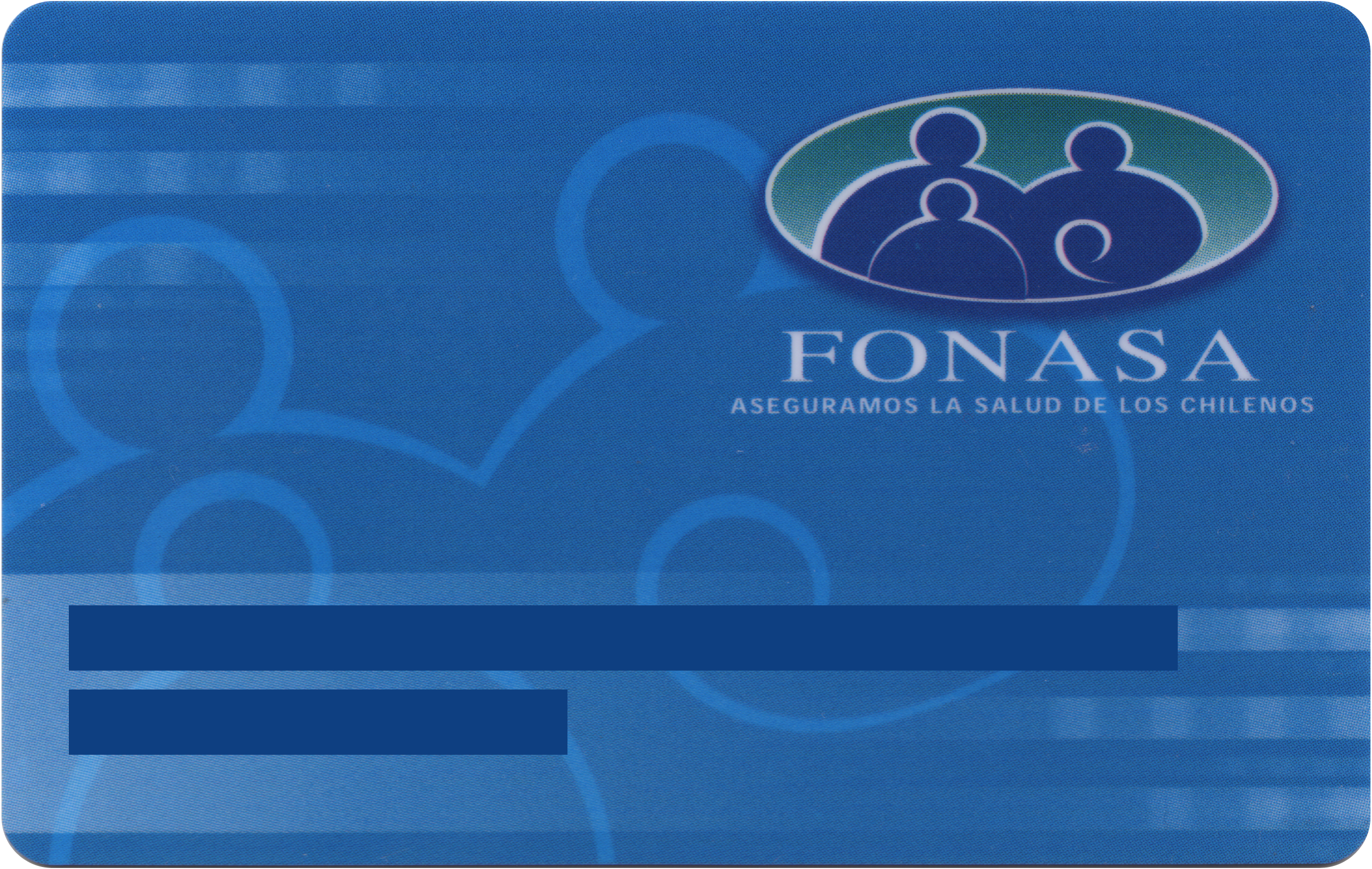
A National Health Fund card (Fonasa)

The Ministry of Health (Minsal) is the cabinet-level administrative office in charge of planning, directing, coordinating, executing, controlling and informing the public health policies formulated by the President of Chile. The National Health Fund (Fonasa), created in 1979, is the financial entity entrusted to collect, manage and distribute state funds for health in Chile. It is funded by the public. All employees pay 7% of their monthly income to the fund.

Fonasa is part of the NHSS and has executive power through the Ministry of Health (Chile). Its headquarters are in Santiago and decentralized public service is conducted by various Regional Offices. More than 12 million beneficiaries benefit from Fonasa. Beneficiaries can also opt for more costly private insurance through Isapre.

In the 2024 Global Hunger Index, Chile is one of 22 countries with a GHI score of less than 5.

== Culture ==
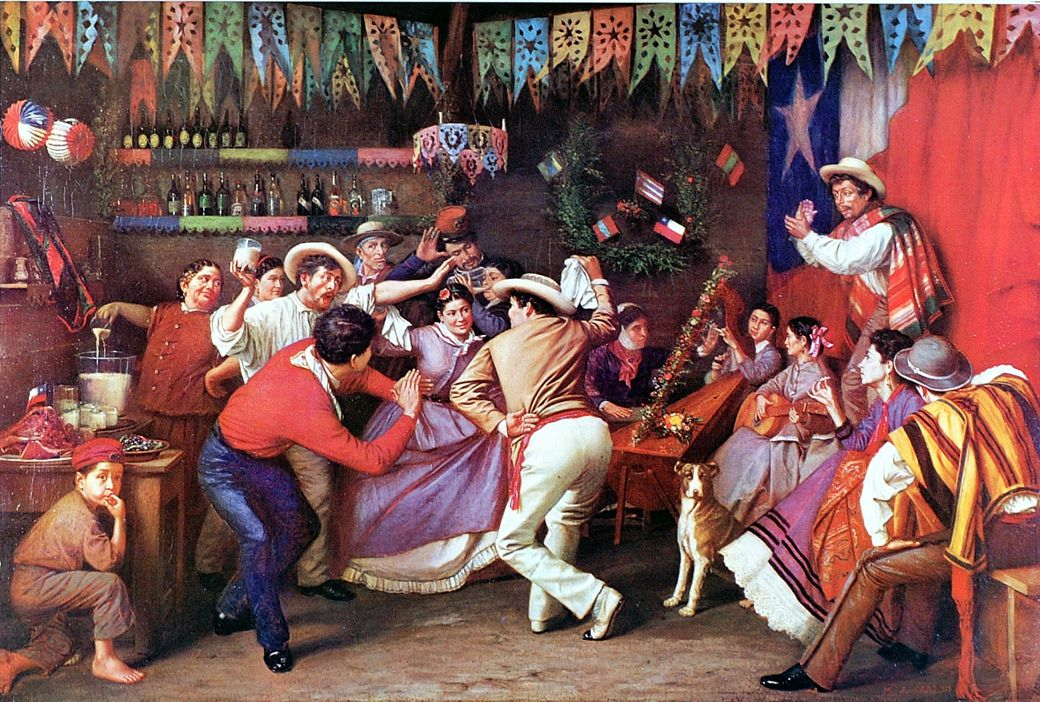
La Zamacueca, 1873, by Manuel Antonio Caro

From the period between early agricultural settlements and up to the late pre-Columbian period, northern Chile was a region of Andean culture that was influenced by altiplano traditions spreading to the coastal valleys of the north, while southern regions were areas of Mapuche cultural activities. Throughout the colonial period following the conquest, and during the early Republican period, the country's culture was dominated by the Spanish. Other European influences, primarily English, French, and German began in the 19th century and have continued to this day. German migrants influenced the Bavarian style rural architecture and cuisine in the south of Chile in cities such as Valdivia, Frutillar, Puerto Varas, Osorno, Temuco, Puerto Octay, Llanquihue, Faja Maisan, Pitrufquén, Victoria, Pucón and Puerto Montt.

=== Cultural heritage ===
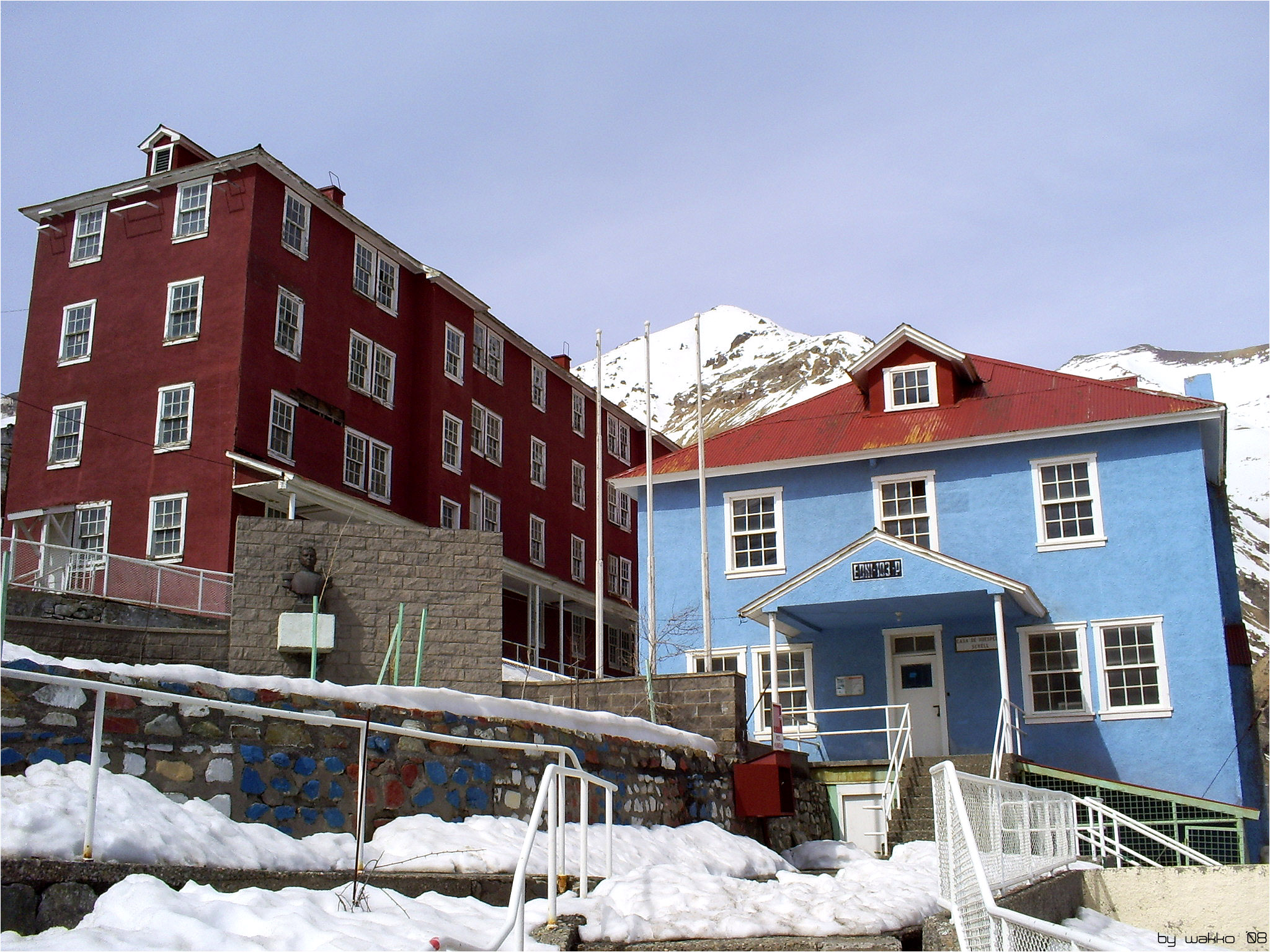
Sewell Mining Town

The cultural heritage of Chile consists of its intangible heritage, composed of cultural events and activities, such as visual arts, crafts, dances, holidays, cuisine, games, music and traditions. Its tangible heritage consists of those buildings, objects and sites of archaeological, architectural, traditional, artistic, ethnographic, folkloric, historical, religious or technological significance scattered through Chilean territory. Among them, some are declared World Heritage Sites by UNESCO, including the Rapa Nui National Park (1995), the Churches of Chiloé (2000), the historical district of the port city of Valparaíso (2003), Humberstone and Santa Laura Saltpeter Works (2005) and the mining city Sewell (2006).

In 1999, Cultural Heritage Day was established as a way to honour and commemorate Chile's cultural heritage. It is an official national event celebrated in May every year.

=== Music and dance ===
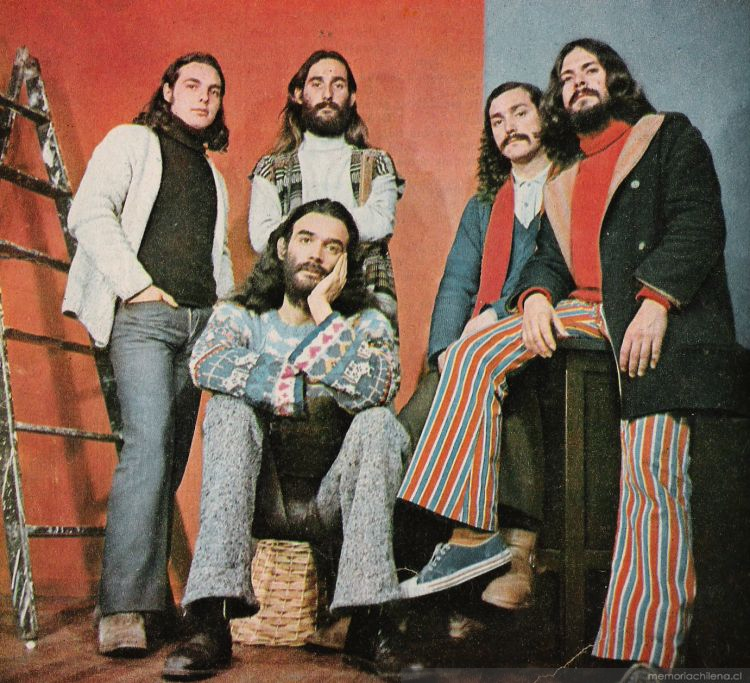
Los Jaivas, one of the most recognized Chilean rock bands

Music in Chile ranges from folkloric, popular and classical music. Its large geography generates different musical styles in the north, center and south of the country, including also Easter Island and Mapuche music. The national dance is the cueca. Another form of traditional Chilean song, though not a dance, is the tonada. Arising from music imported by the Spanish colonists, it is distinguished from the cueca by an intermediate melodic section and a more prominent melody.

From the 1950s to the 1970s, native folk musical forms were revitalized with the Nueva canción chilena movement led by composers such as Violeta Parra, Raúl de Ramón and Pedro Messone, which was also associated with political activists and reformers such as Víctor Jara, Inti-Illimani, and Quilapayún. Also, many Chilean rock bands like Los Jaivas, Los Prisioneros, La Ley, Los Tres and Los Bunkers have reached international success, some incorporating strong folk influences, such as Los Jaivas. In February, annual music and comedy festivals are held in Viña del Mar. In recent times, pop music has been at the forefront of Chilean entertainment. Q ARE, a boy band that takes inspiration from K-pop, have been the pioneers for a rising genre called "ChisPop", a play on words on "pop chileno" or "Chilean pop" in English.

=== Literature ===
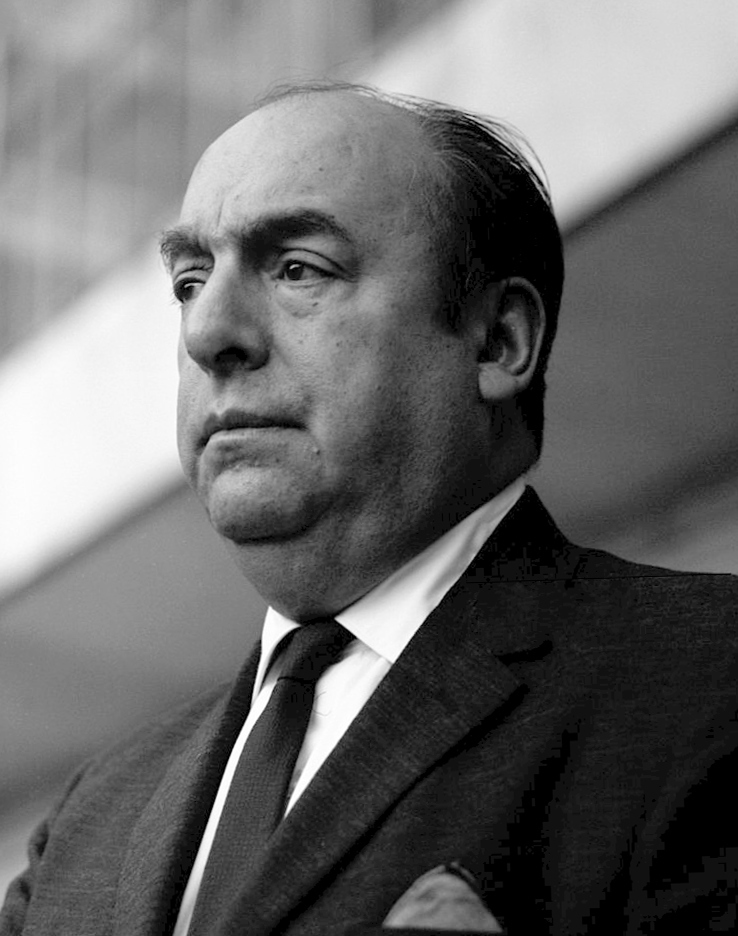
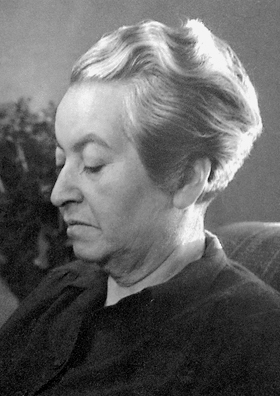
Pablo Neruda and Gabriela Mistral, Nobel Prize recipients in literature

Chile has been called a "country of poets". Gabriela Mistral was the first Latin American to receive a Nobel Prize in Literature (1945). Chile's most famous poet is Pablo Neruda, who received the Nobel Prize for Literature (1971) and is world-renowned for his extensive library of works on romance, nature, and politics. His three highly personalized homes in Isla Negra, Santiago and Valparaíso are popular tourist destinations.

Among the list of other Chilean poets are Carlos Pezoa Véliz, Vicente Huidobro, Gonzalo Rojas, Pablo de Rokha, Nicanor Parra, Ivonne Coñuecar and Raúl Zurita. Isabel Allende is the best-selling Chilean novelist, with 51 million of her novels sold worldwide. Novelist José Donoso's 1970 novel The Obscene Bird of Night is considered by critic Harold Bloom to be one of the canonical works of 20th-century Western literature. Another internationally recognized Chilean novelist and poet is Roberto Bolaño, whose translations into English have had an excellent reception from the critics.

=== Folklore ===
The folklore of Chile, cultural and demographic characteristics of the country, is the result of the mixture of Spanish and Amerindian elements that occurred during the colonial period. Due to cultural and historical reasons, they are classified and distinguished four major areas in the country: northern areas, central, southern and south. Most of the traditions of the culture of Chile have a festive purpose, but some, such as dances and ceremonies, have religious components.

Chilean mythology is the mythology and beliefs of the Folklore of Chile. This includes Chilote mythology, Rapa Nui mythology and Mapuche mythology.

=== Cuisine ===
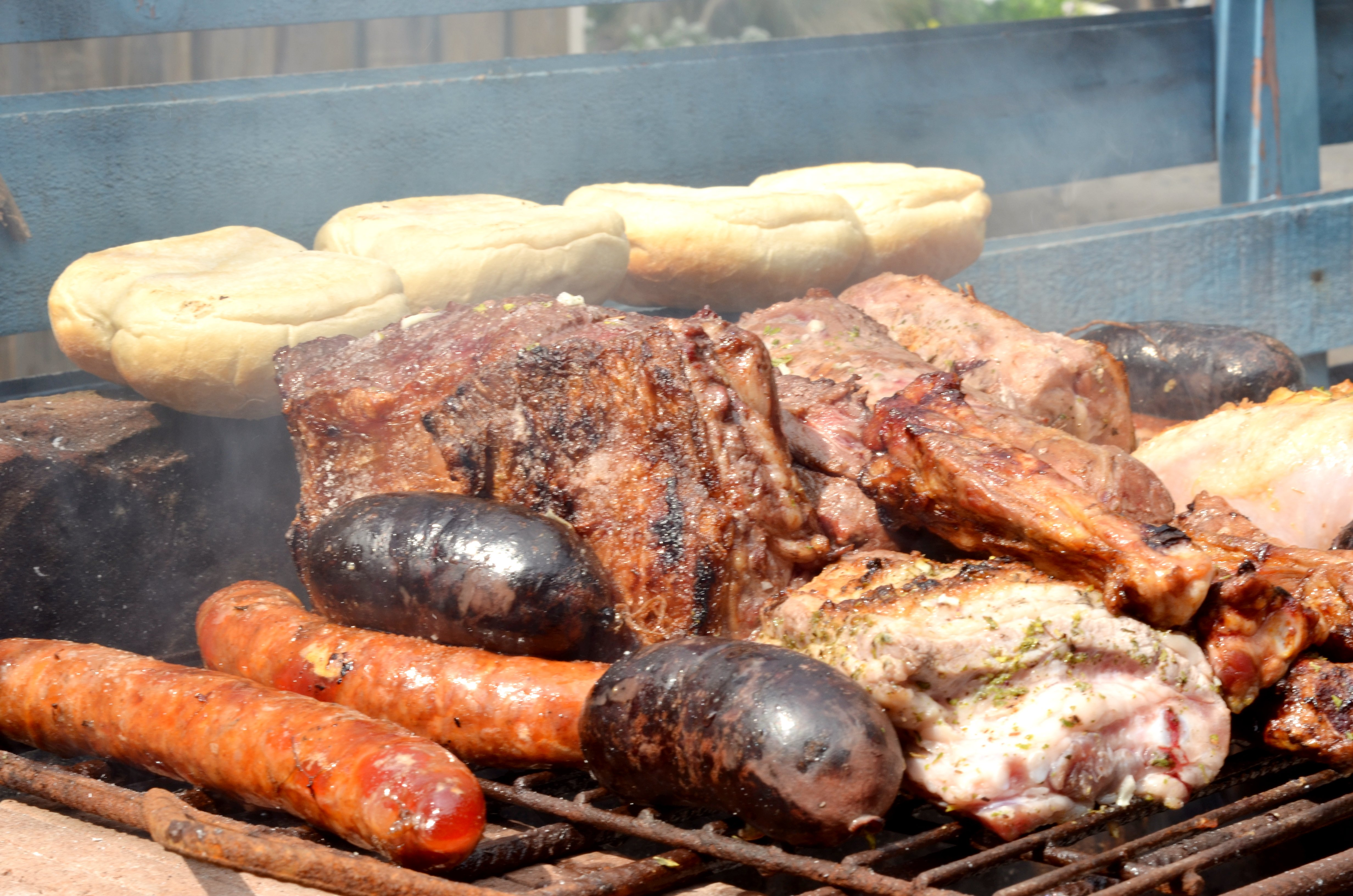
Chilean asado (barbecue) and marraqueta

Chilean cuisine is a reflection of the country's topographical variety, featuring an assortment of seafood, beef, fruits, and vegetables. Traditional recipes include asado, cazuela, empanadas, humitas, pastel de choclo, pastel de papas, curanto, and sopaipillas. Crudos is an example of the mixture of culinary contributions from the various ethnic influences in Chile. The raw minced llama, heavy use of shellfish, and rice bread were taken from native Quechua Andean cuisine, (although beef, brought to Chile by Europeans, is also used in place of the llama meat). Lemon and onions were brought by the Spanish colonists, and the use of mayonnaise and yogurt was introduced by German immigrants, as was beer.

=== Sports ===
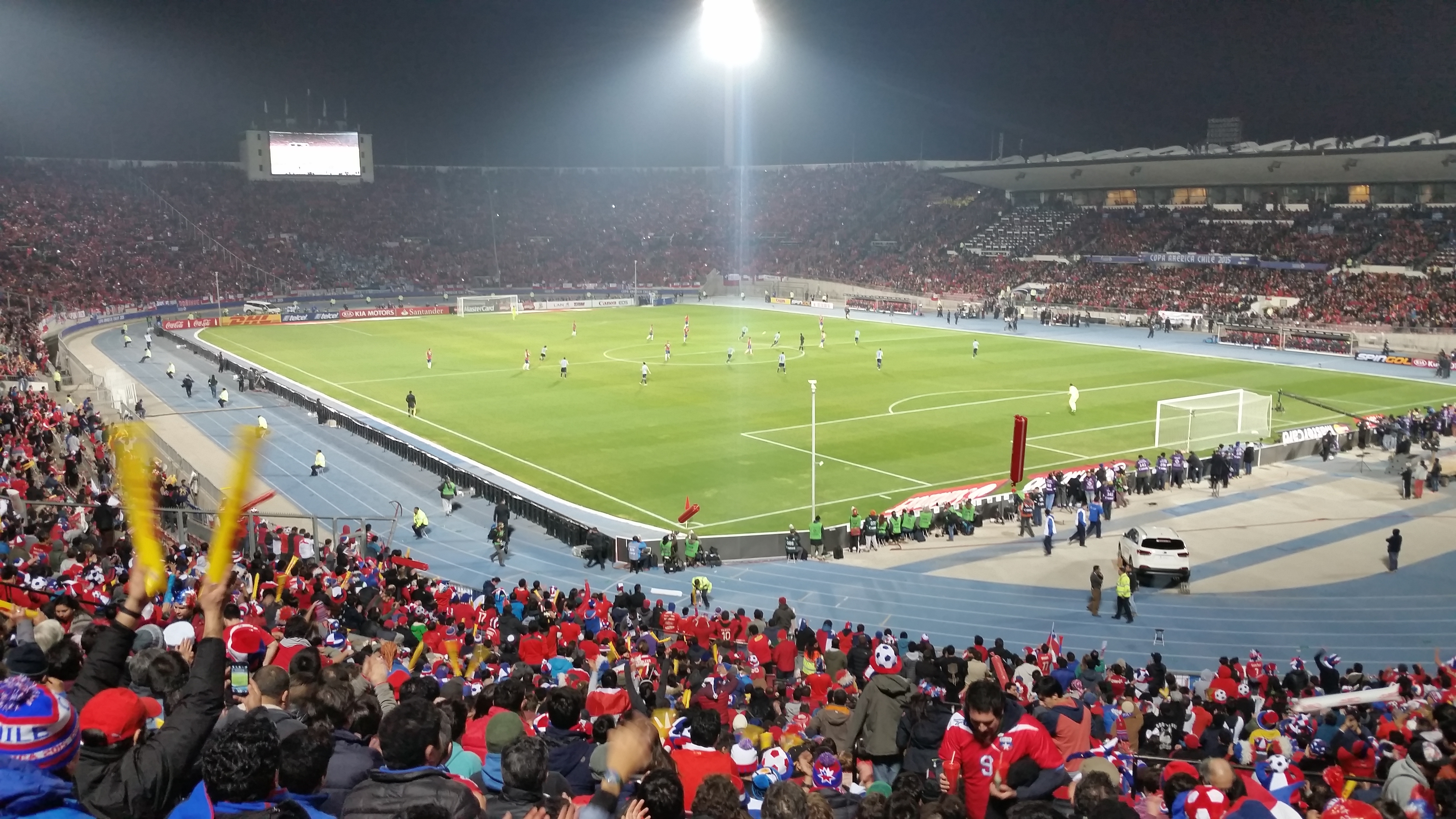
Estadio Nacional Julio Martínez Prádanos

Chile's most popular sport is association football. Chile has appeared in nine FIFA World Cups which includes hosting the 1962 FIFA World Cup where the national football team finished third. Other results achieved by the national football team include two Copa América titles (2015 and 2016), two runners-up positions, one silver and two bronze medals at the Pan American Games, a bronze medal at the 2000 Summer Olympics and two third places finishes in the FIFA under-17 and under-20 youth tournaments. The top league in the Chilean football league system is the Chilean Primera División, which is named by the IFFHS as the ninth strongest national football league in the world.

The main football clubs are Colo-Colo, Universidad de Chile and Universidad Católica. Colo-Colo is the country's most successful football club, having both the most national and international championships, including the coveted Copa Libertadores South American club tournament. Universidad de Chile was the last international champion (Copa Sudamericana 2011).

Tennis is Chile's most successful sport. Its national team won the World Team Cup clay tournament twice (2003 & 2004), and played the Davis Cup final against Italy in 1976. At the 2004 Summer Olympics the country captured gold and bronze in men's singles and gold in men's doubles (Nicolás Massú obtained two gold medals). Marcelo Ríos became the first Latin American man to reach the number one spot in the ATP singles rankings in 1998. Anita Lizana won the US Open in 1937, becoming the first woman from Latin America to win a Grand Slam tournament. Luis Ayala was twice a runner-up at the French Open and both Ríos and Fernando González reached the Australian Open men's singles finals. González also won a silver medal in singles at the 2008 Summer Olympics in Beijing.

At the Summer Olympic Games Chile boasts a total of two gold medals (tennis), seven silver medals (athletics, equestrian, boxing, shooting and tennis) and four bronze medals (tennis, boxing and football). In 2012, Chile won its first Paralympic Games medal (gold in Athletics).

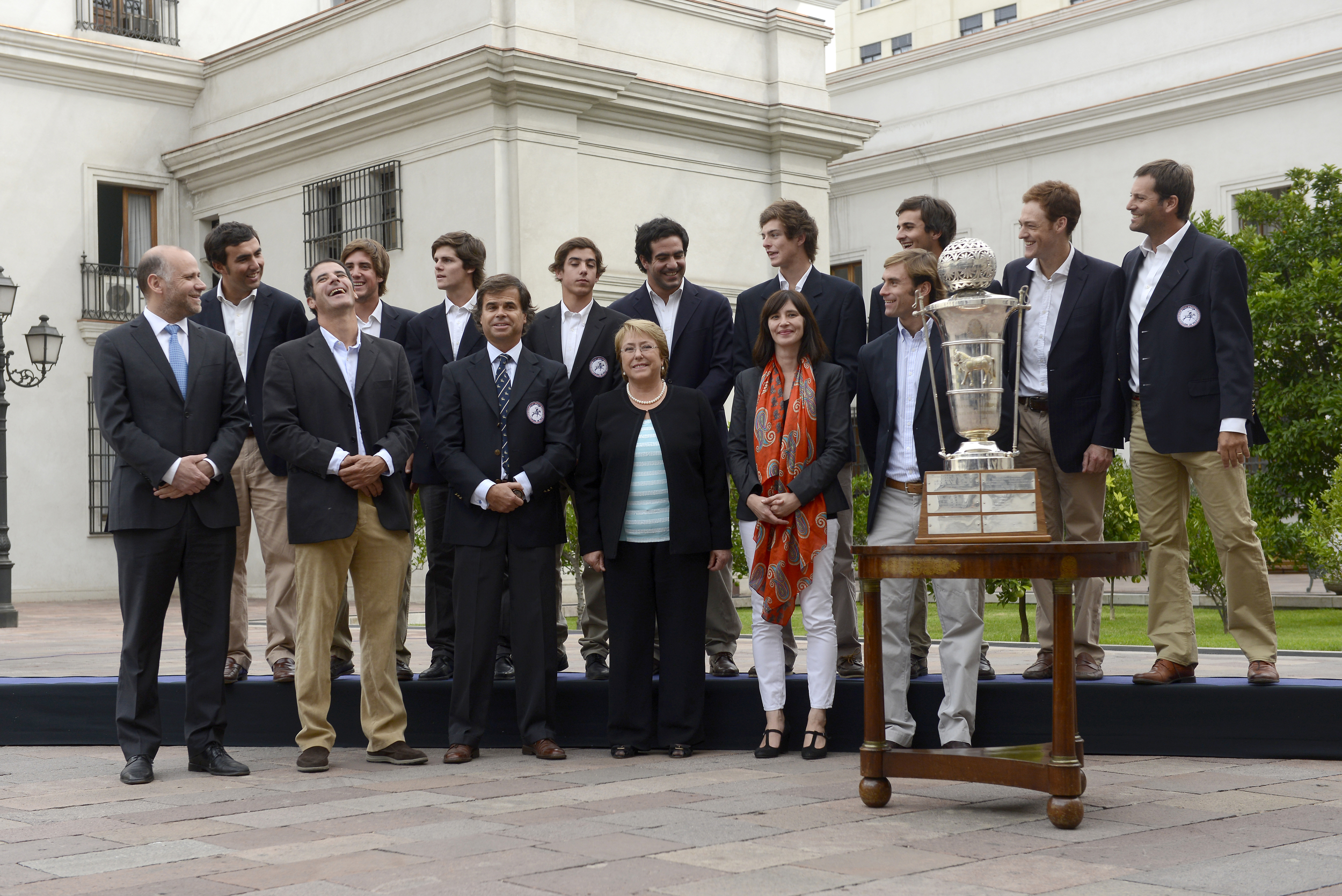
The Chilean national polo team with President Michelle Bachelet and the trophy of the 2015 World Polo Championship

Rodeo is the country's national sport and is practiced in the more rural areas of the nation. A sport similar to hockey called chueca was played by the Mapuche people during the Spanish conquest. Skiing and snowboarding are practiced at ski centers located in the Central Andes, and in southern ski centers near to cities as Osorno, Puerto Varas, Temuco and Punta Arenas. Surfing is popular at some coastal towns. Polo is professionally practiced within Chile, with the country achieving top prize in the 2008 and 2015 World Polo Championship.

Basketball is a popular sport in which Chile earned a bronze medal in the first men's FIBA World Championship held in 1950 and won a second bronze medal when Chile hosted the 1959 FIBA World Championship. Chile hosted the first FIBA World Championship for Women in 1953 finishing the tournament with the silver medal. San Pedro de Atacama is host to the annual "Atacama Crossing", a six-stage, 250-kilometer (160 mi) footrace which annually attracts about 150 competitors from 35 countries. The Dakar Rally off-road automobile race has been held in both Chile and Argentina since 2009.

== See also ==
- Outline of Chile
