= Jaime Burrows =

Chilean politician (born 1972)

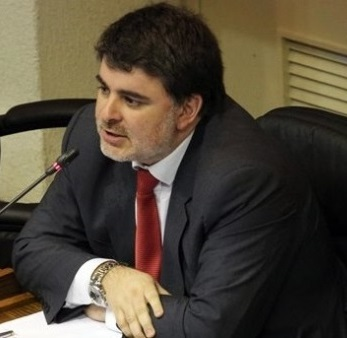

Minister of Health
- In office 30 December 2014 – 23 January 2015
- President: Michelle Bachelet
- Preceded by: Helia Molina
- Succeeded by: Carmen Castillo Taucher

Undesecretary of Health
- In office 11 March 2014 – 11 March 2018
- President: Michelle Bachelet
- Preceded by: Jorge Díaz
- Succeeded by: Paula Daza

Personal details
- Born: 14 April 1972 (age 54) Santiago, Chile
- Party: Christian Democratic Party
- Education: University of Chile (B.Sc); Pontifical Catholic University of Chile (M.D.); Keele University (M.Sc)
- Occupation: Scholar; Politician
- Profession: Physician

Jaime Eduardo Burrows Oyarzún (born 14 April 1972) is a Chilean physician, scholar and politician.

A member of the Christian Democratic Party, he served as Undersecretary of Public Health during the second government of Michelle Bachelet (2014−2018). He also served as Deputy Minister of Health for Bachelet's second term from 30 December 2014 to 23 January 2015.

As a scholar, Burrows has worked at universities such as the University of Chile, the Pontifical Catholic University of Chile, the University for Development, the Andrés Bello National University, the Diego Portales University or the Autonomous University of Chile. He began as an assistant-student in the teaching of clinical and methodological subjects, until gradually deriving over the years to teaching and research about bioethics and ethics of health systems. He has also practiced his career as a clinical physician in various Chilean healthcare establishments, mainly in the public sector.

== Early life ==
Burrows attended to the Colegio del Verbo Divino, from which he graduated in 1989 as the better of his generation. Then, when he joined to the University of Chile, he completed his studies in Medicine in 1997, for then doing a PgD in Pediatrics (2003) as well as a master's degree in bioethics for the Pontifical Catholic University of Chile.

In his years as an undergraduate student, Burrows was Member of the University of Chile Student Federation (FECh) representing to his Faculty of Medicine (1991−1992), being President of the Council of Members of the federation (1992) and being President of the University Christian Democracy (DCU) in 1996.

== Political & Professional career ==
On 30 December 2014, Burrows assumed as a caretaker Minister of Health after Helia Molina's resignation to the position. Finally, on 23 January, he finished his term being replaced by the socialist Carmen Castillo Taucher.

After his period as minister, Burrows returned to his professional field and also served as an international consultant on health policy. Similarly ―in Chile―, he was as a member of the board of directors of the National Autonomous Corporation for Certification of Medical Specialties (CONACEM). By the other hand, he become Director of the Bachelor of Medicine at the Autonomous University of Chile.

In 2019, he obtained a Master of Arts in Ethics at the Keele University of the United Kingdom. His thesis was «Healthcare Reform in Chile: Equality of What?».
