= Obesity in Chile =

Health issue in Chile

Obesity in Chile is a growing health concern with health officials stating that it is one of the leading causes of preventable deaths in the Chile. According to Forbes, Chile ranks 23 on a 2007 list of fattest countries with a percentage of 65.3% of its citizens with an unhealthy weight (defined as having a BMI above 25 or below 18). Until the late 1980s, malnourishment was the major concern and many poor Chileans were underweight. However economic development has brought an obesity crisis, which the government is taking measures to solve.

== See also ==
- Health in Chile
- Epidemiology of obesity
