= María Soledad Barría =

Chilean politician

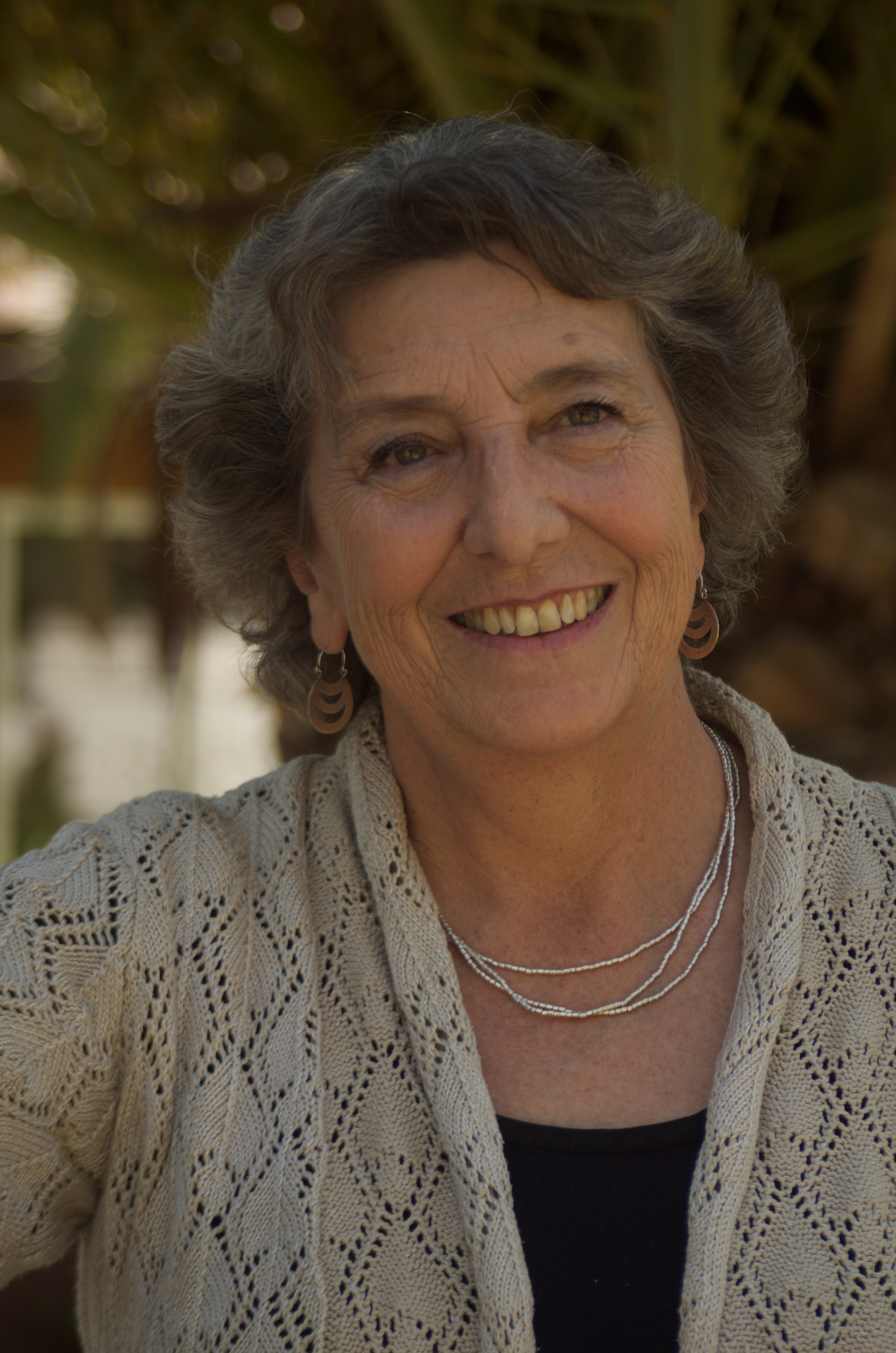

Minister of Health
- In office 11 March 2006 – 28 October 2008
- President: Michelle Bachelet
- Preceded by: Pedro García Aspillaga
- Succeeded by: Álvaro Erazo

Personal details
- Born: 27 October 1953 (age 72) Osorno, Chile
- Party: Socialist Party
- Spouse(s): Oscar Neira (1978−present)
- Children: Two
- Parent(s): Daniel Barría; María Iroume
- Education: University of Chile
- Occupation: Politician
- Profession: Physician

María Soledad Barría Iroume (born 27 October 1953) is a Chilean physician who served as minister during the first government of Michelle Bachelet (2006–2010).

== Biography ==
She is the daughter of María Margarita Iroume Carrere and Daniel Osvaldo Barría Sánchez, a lawyer and Christian Democrat politician who served as Undersecretary of Agriculture during the administration of President Eduardo Frei Montalva and later as Chilean ambassador to Yugoslavia. She spent part of her adolescence in that country and developed a sympathy for the government of Josip Broz Tito.

After returning to Chile, she began studying medicine at the University of Chile, where she openly supported the left-wing Popular Unity (UP) coalition. During those years, she met Michelle Bachelet, who was two years ahead of her in medical school and a classmate of her brother Cristián.

During the military dictatorship of General Augusto Pinochet, she collaborated with the Vicariate of Solidarity in medical assistance programs, working alongside Fanny Pollarolo. In 1979, she participated in the occupation of the headquarters of the Medical College of Chile together with a group of colleagues. She was subsequently taken to a police station and placed under house arrest for approximately ten days.

She later moved to Corral in southern Chile, where she worked as a rural general practitioner until 1983. During that period, she served as director of the local hospital and was its sole physician for two years. She subsequently received a scholarship to specialize in internal medicine at the San Juan de Dios Hospital in Santiago, earning her specialist certification from the University of Chile in 1986.

She then spent a year in Paris, France, undertaking advanced training in kidney transplantation. During the 1990s, she joined the Ministry of Health, where she renewed her acquaintance with Michelle Bachelet.

She has been married since 1978 to Óscar Javier Neira Quiroga, and they have two children, Paz Julieta and Vicente.

== Political career ==
In the 1996 Chilean municipal elections, she ran for a seat on the municipal council of Providencia.

On 11 March 2006, she was appointed Minister of Health in the first administration of President Michelle Bachelet.

During her tenure, Chile's healthcare reform was further advanced through the implementation of the AUGE Plan, which sought to modernize the provision of health services by establishing explicit guarantees of coverage for selected medical conditions.

Her tenure, however, was marked by a series of high-profile controversies, including disputes with professional associations, the inauguration of a hospital that was not fully prepared to operate, and, most notably, a scandal involving failures in notifying individuals infected with HIV in Iquique. The episode ultimately led her to tender her resignation on 27 October 2008, which was accepted the following day.

She later ran for mayor of Puente Alto as the candidate of the Concertación coalition in the 2012 Chilean municipal elections. She was defeated by National Renewal politician Germán Codina.

She ran again in the 2016 Chilean municipal elections, this time as the candidate of the New Majority coalition, but was once again defeated by Codina.
