= Carlos Vassallo Rojas =

Chilean politician

Ambassador of Chile to Italy
- In office 1971–1977
- Appointed by: Salvador Allende
- Preceded by: Hernán Cuevas Irarrázaval
- Succeeded by: Carlos Mardones Restat

Minister of Labor
- In office 14 April 1954 – 20 April 1954
- President: Carlos Ibáñez del Campo
- Preceded by: Pedro Foncea Aedo
- Succeeded by: Antonio Lanchares

Minister of Health
- In office 1 March 1954 – 4 June 1954
- President: Carlos Ibáñez del Campo
- Preceded by: Eugenio Suárez Herreros
- Succeeded by: Sergio Altamirano

Personal details
- Born: 26 June 1908 Santiago, Chile
- Died: 29 July 1983 (aged 75) Santiago, Chile
- Party: None (1954−1958); Close to left-wing (1958−1983)
- Spouse: Carmen Vásquez
- Children: Carlos Vassallo Vásquez
- Relatives: Emilio Vassallo Rojas Rodolfo Vassallo Rojas (brother)
- Education: Pontifical Catholic University of Chile
- Profession: Lawyer

Carlos Vassallo Rojas (Santiago, 26 June 1908 – Santiago, 28 July 1983) was a Chilean lawyer, journalist, diplomat, and politician.

He served as Minister of Public Health and Social Welfare and Undersecretary of Foreign Affairs during the second administration of President Carlos Ibáñez del Campo, and later as Chilean ambassador to Italy under President Salvador Allende.

== Early life ==
Vassallo was born in Santiago, Chile, on 26 June 1908, the son of Rodolfo Vassallo Grimaldi and Emilia Rojas González. He studied law and subsequently practised as a lawyer, establishing a law firm with Bernardo Leighton. He also pursued a career in journalism, writing for El Mercurio, Las Últimas Noticias, and the international magazine Visión.

Vassallo married Marta Correa Escobar, with whom he had a daughter. He later married Carmen Vásquez, with whom he had a son, Carlos Vassallo Vásquez.

== Political career ==
Vassallo held several public and diplomatic positions during his career. On 1 March 1954, President Carlos Ibáñez del Campo appointed him Minister of Public Health and Social Welfare, a position he held until 4 June of that year. He concurrently served as acting Minister of Labour from 14 to 20 April 1954. He was subsequently appointed Undersecretary of Foreign Affairs, serving until 1957.

During this period, Vassallo represented Chile at international organisations and conferences. He was a member of the Chilean delegation to the tenth session of the United Nations General Assembly and headed the country's delegation to the 1956 UNESCO General Conference in New Delhi, India. In 1956, he was awarded the Order of Merit of the Federal Republic of Germany.

An independent associated with the political left, Vassallo supported Salvador Allende during the 1964 presidential election and later participated in activities supporting Pablo Neruda's prospective presidential candidacy ahead of the 1970 election. In April 1971, Allende appointed him ambassador to Italy. While serving in Rome, he was also president of the Istituto Italo-Latino Americano and supported cultural exchanges between Chile and Italy.

Following the 1973 Chilean coup d'état, Vassallo remained in Italy and became involved in organisations supporting Chilean exiles and opposing the new military regime. Chilean authorities subsequently prevented him from returning to the country on national-security grounds. He was eventually permitted to return to Chile in early 1982. Vassallo died in Santiago on 28 July 1983, aged 75.

== Honors ==
- Order of Merit of the Federal Republic of Germany
