= Igor Garafulic =

Chilean economist

Igor Garafulic Olivares
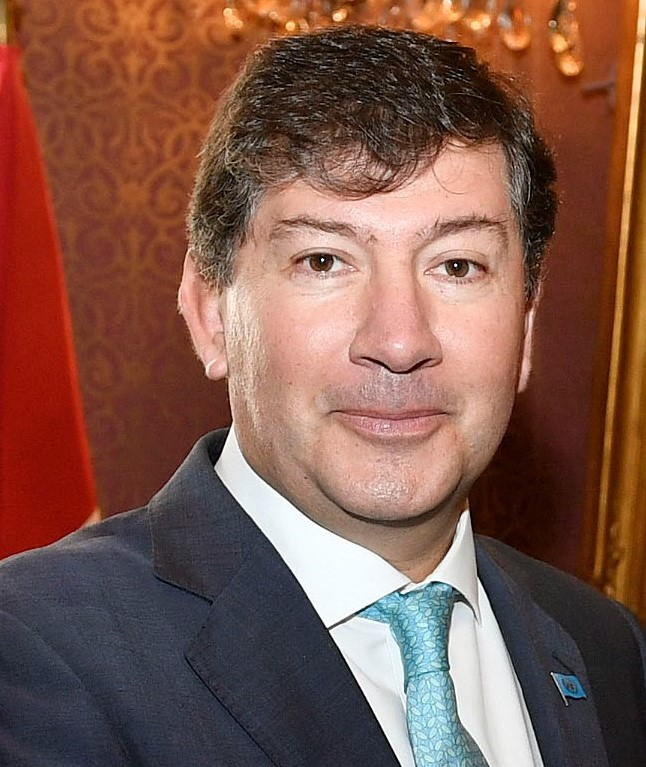

Intendant of Santiago Metropolitan Region
- In office November 2008 – March 2010
- President: Michelle Bachelet
- Preceded by: Álvaro Erazo Latorre
- Succeeded by: Fernando Echeverría

Igor Garafulic Olivares is a Chilean economist, academic, and former intendant of the Santiago Metropolitan Region under the 2006 - 2010 administration of president Michelle Bachelet.

== Education ==
During his childhood he lived in Venezuela, Sweden and Mozambique. At age fifteen, he returned to Chile, completing his secondary education at the Instituto Nacional (National Institute) in Santiago.

Garafulic then studied business engineering at the University of Chile, earning a mention in economics where he started his political career as a student leader, first in the Radical Party and then the Party for Democracy.

== Career ==
His career began as a director for Santiago's National Youth Institute (INJ) in the year 1990 when he entered the Economic Directorate of the Foreign Ministry. He left the department to become an economic adviser on North America. After earning a Master of Science degree from Oxford University, where his thesis was on the implications for Chile of its entry into North American Free Trade Agreement. Until his appointment as intendant, he served as Director of Multilateral Economic Affairs of the Foreign Ministry, under the responsibility of representing Chile in the World Trade Organization (WTO), Asia-Pacific Economic Cooperation (APEC) and Organisation for Economic Co-operation and Development (OECD).

Since 1990, he joined the negotiating teams of the free trade agreements (FTAs) that Chile has signed. In 2005, he participated as "Chief Negotiator of the Agricultural Chapter" in the FTA with China and joined the Joint Study Group that evaluated the FTA with Japan. He also participated as a negotiator of the Government of Chile on FTAs with the United States, European Union, South Korea and New Zealand, responsibilities turned from the Economic Department of the Foreign Ministry and the Ministry of Agriculture.

In November 2008, Garafulic replaced Álvaro Erazo as the intendant of the SRM following Erazo's appointment as the Minister of Health, and remained in that role until the end of the first Bachelet administration.

He held various senior positions with the United Nations Development Programme (UNDP) as Country Director for Guatemala (2014‑2017), and Senior Adviser for the UNDP Regional Office for Latin America and the Caribbean in New York (2010‑2013).

From 2018 to September 2019, Garafulic served as United Nations Resident Coordinator and UNDP Resident Representative for Honduras. For his noteworthy work in the political dialogue process, Garafulic was decorated with the "Gran Cruz Placa de Plata" grade of the Order José Cecilio del Valle by the Executive Branch, as well with the grade of "Gran Cruz Placa de Oro" and"Pergamino Especial" by the Legislative Branch.

Since October 2019, he has served as the United Nations Resident Coordinator in Peru.

== Personal life ==
Garafulic is married to Macarena Hermosilla and has two children.
