= Ximena Aguilera =

Chilean politician

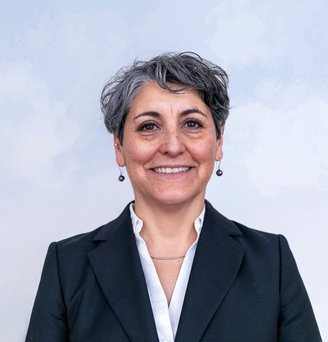

Minister of Health
- In office 6 September 2022 – 11 March 2026
- President: Gabriel Boric
- Preceded by: María Begoña Yarza
- Succeeded by: May Chomalí

Personal details
- Born: 7 October 1964 (age 61) Colbún, Chile
- Party: None
- Parent: Pablo Aguilera
- Education: University of Chile (MD)
- Occupation: Politician
- Profession: Physician

Ximena Paz Aguilera Sanhueza (born 7 October 1964) is a Chilean physician and politician, currently serving as her country's Minister of Health since 6 September 2022.

== Biography ==
Ximena Aguilera is the daughter of journalist and radio host Pablo Aguilera. In 1987, she graduated as a surgeon from the University of Chile, from where she also holds a master's degree in public health.

== Public career ==
Aguilera was head of the Epidemiology Division of the Ministry of Health of Chile between 1999 and 2005, and then served as head of the Health Planning Division of the Ministry of Health until 2008.

Between 2008 and 2010, she served as Senior Advisor for Communicable Diseases at the Pan American Health Organization in Washington, D.C., coordinating the organization's technical response to the 2009 swine flu pandemic. Aguilera has also worked as a consultant for other international organizations, such as the World Health Organization (WHO), the United Nations Development Programme (UNDP) and the World Bank, in various countries in Latin America and in China.

During the COVID-19 pandemic in Chile, Aguilera became part of the National Commission for Pandemic Response, heading its External Advisory Council. In this role, she criticized the former government of Sebastián Piñera for lack of transparency in the delivery of data.

On 6 September 2022, Aguilera replaced María Begoña Yarza as Minister of Health in the cabinet of Gabriel Boric, after a cabinet reshuffle following the rejection of the proposed new constitution in the 2022 Chilean national plebiscite. Prior to her appointment as Minister, Aguilera was director of the Center for Epidemiology and Health Policies of the Faculty of Medicine at the University for Development.
