= Álvaro Erazo =

Chilean politician and physician

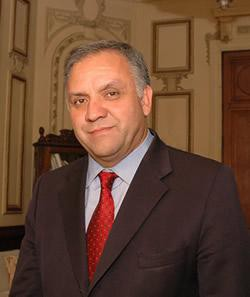
- Erazo in 2008

Minister of Health
- In office 6 November 2008 – 11 March 2010
- Preceded by: María Soledad Barría
- Succeeded by: Jaime Mañalich

Intendant of Santiago Metropolitan Region
- In office 7 January 2008 – 6 November 2008
- Preceded by: Adriana Delpiano
- Succeeded by: Igor Garafulic

Undersecretary of Health
- In office 14 July 1998 – 11 March 2000
- Preceded by: Fernando Muñoz Porras
- Succeeded by: Ernesto Behnke Gutiérrez

Personal details
- Born: 15 August 1958 (age 68) Santiago, Chile
- Party: Socialist Party
- Spouse(s): María Soledad Espinoza (1983−2014)
- Children: Five
- Education: University of Chile (B.Sc); Johns Hopkins University (PhD)
- Occupation: Politician
- Profession: Physician

Álvaro Fernando Erazo Latorre (born 15 August 1958) is a Chilean politician and physician.

From December 2008 to March 2010, he served as Minister of Health.

== Family and education ==
He is the son of Álvaro Erazo Corona and Lucía Eugenia Latorre Salinas. He studied medicine, specializing in pediatrics. He later earned a Master of Science degree from the Institute of Nutrition and Food Technology (INTA) of the University of Chile, and completed postgraduate studies in advanced epidemiology at the National Institute of Public Health of Mexico and Johns Hopkins University in the United States.

He married social worker María Soledad Espinoza Cuevas in 1983; they divorced in 2014. The couple had three children: Joaquín, Daniela and Camila.

== Political career ==
A member of the Revolutionary Left Movement (MIR) during his university years, he served as a leader of the University of Chile Student Federation (FECh) in the 1980s. During that period, he was prosecuted under the State Security Law for his participation in protests against the military dictatorship of General Augusto Pinochet. He later joined the Socialist Party of Chile.

During the administration of President Eduardo Frei Ruiz-Tagle, he served as chief of staff to the Undersecretariat of Health from 1994 to 1998. During that period, he chaired the Commission for the Institutional Strengthening of Environmental Health (1995–1996) and the Commission for the Strengthening of Occupational Health (1996–1997), both under the Ministry of Health.

He subsequently served as Undersecretary of Health between 1998 and 2000, and as National Director of the National Health Fund (Fonasa) from 2000 to 2006 under President Ricardo Lagos. He also participated in the AUGE Council and the Health Reform Commission between 2001 and 2005.

In April 2006, he was appointed by Michelle Bachelet to the board of directors of BancoEstado, alongside Nicolás Eyzaguirre, Francisco Vidal and Sergio Páez. At the same time, he assumed the leadership of the Medical Legal Service (SML), where he was tasked with addressing the crisis caused by the misidentification of the remains of political prisoners executed and buried in Patio 29 of the General Cemetery of Santiago.

On 5 January 2007, he became the first Socialist to serve as Intendant of the Santiago Metropolitan Region since 1973, having been appointed by President Michelle Bachelet.

He left that position on 6 November 2008 to become Minister of Health following the resignation of María Soledad Barría. During his tenure, he faced two major public health emergencies: the 2008–2009 listeriosis outbreaks and the H1N1 influenza outbreak, as well as difficulties affecting several public hospitals. He left office on 11 March 2010.

Following the end of the administration, he served as a director of the Bulpa holding company (formerly Isapre Cruz Blanca) from 2011 to 2016, and has worked as an international consultant and associate professor at the Pontifical Catholic University of Chile. During the second administration of Sebastián Piñera, he was appointed in April 2020 to the advisory committee established by the Ministry of Health to address the COVID-19 pandemic in Chile.

In November of that year, he ran in the 2020 Unidad Constituyente regional governor primaries as the Socialist Party candidate for Governor of the Santiago Metropolitan Region, but was defeated by Claudio Orrego.

On 15 July 2025, he assumed the position of Dean of the Faculty of Medicine and Health Sciences at the Universidad Mayor.
