= COVID-19 pandemic in Chile =

- Map with confirmed cases and deaths by region as of 20 February 2023.
- Disease: COVID-19
- Pathogen: SARS-CoV-2
- Location: Chile
- Index case: San Javier, Maule Region
- Arrival date: 3 March 2020 (6 years, 7 months, 3 weeks and 3 days)
- Confirmed cases: 5,239,884 ll
- Hospitalized cases: 1,435
- Ventilator cases: 1,734
- Recovered: 5,166,996 (Note: The Chilean Ministry of Health considered all cases as a "recovered" after 14 days since the initial symptoms of the virus, no matter the health situation of the infected or if following tests indicate the continuing presence of the virus. The only exception were casualties, which are not included as recovered. On 25 May 2020, Minister Jaime Mañalich confirmed that the number informed does not represent the number of clinically recovered people, but just an estimation of the number of non-contagious cases. Between 2 and 28 June, the government didn't release the number of recovered cases in their daily report.)
- Deaths: 52,056 (PCR+); 64,416 (all cases) (Note: Daily reports include only deaths with positive PCR tests and catalogued as "COVID-19 related death" by the Department of Statistics and Health Information (DEIS). This number is informed on the daily reports of the Ministry of Health. The total number of COVID-19 deaths, including suspected cases where PCR test were not available, are published in the epidemiology reports on a weekly basis.)
- Fatality rate: 1.19%

Government website
- Cifras Oficiales

The worldwide pandemic of coronavirus disease 2019 (COVID-19) caused by severe acute respiratory syndrome coronavirus 2 (SARS-CoV-2) severely affected Chile. The virus was confirmed to have reached Chile on 3 March 2020. Initial cases had been imported from Southeast Asia and Europe, and expanded into a large number of untraceable infections, placing the country within phase 4 of the pandemic as defined by the World Health Organization, with over 1,000 confirmed cases by 25 March 2020.

The cases were concentrated in the Santiago metropolitan area, with outbreaks in other regions in the country. No national lockdown was established in Chile, unlike in neighboring Argentina and Peru, although a night curfew was implemented throughout the country. Quarantines were established locally in different cities and neighborhoods. However, in May 2020 the whole city of Santiago was put under mandatory quarantine due to an increase of cases, and similar situations were extended to most of the largest cities in Chile.

Considering its population, by June 2020 Chile had one of the worst outbreaks in the world. Initially, the number of fatalities reported was lower than in other countries in South America, even those with fewer cases. However, in May 2020, the number of cases and deaths increased rapidly, while several sources reported excess deaths not officially attributed to COVID-19, which were not counted. By June 2020, the government confirmed thousands of additional deaths due to COVID-19, including suspected cases where PCR tests were not available. The pandemic reached a peak on 13 June with 195 daily confirmed deaths and nearly 7,000 positive cases. By July 2020, 10,000 people had died, and Chile had the sixth largest number of cases in the world. In the following weeks, the number of daily cases and deaths started to decrease slowly, although some local outbreaks appeared. The number of cases increased later in the year, and by March 2021 the number of daily cases had exceeded those in the initial wave.

Chile became one of the first countries to start a nationwide program to vaccinate against COVID-19. On 24 December 2020, the first batch of vaccines arrived in the country to inoculate mainly health workers. With larger batches of vaccines (mainly Sinovac's CoronaVac) arriving from February 2021, Chile became one of the fastest countries in the world to inoculate their population: by March 2021 a quarter of the population had received at least one dose. This fast response was due to signing contracts with multiple providers, a strong public immunization program, and little anti-vaccine sentiment. Despite the success of the vaccination program the number of cases increased, which has been attributed to early relaxation of restrictions and a false sense of security.

With more than 92,000 cases and 2,500 deaths per million inhabitants, the impact of the pandemic has been great in the South American country. In March 2020, when the first cases of COVID-19 were reported, the country was still facing protests and riots (Note: As a result of the COVID-19 pandemic, many of those who suffered eye injuries during the 2019–2020 protests have not been able to continue their treatments. In the cases where injured have gone to hospital for treatment and supervision some have had to share rooms with COVID-19 patients.) that had begun in October 2019, and the pandemic affected the scheduled 2020 Chilean constitutional referendum, which was rescheduled and held later in the year. Partial lockdowns and quarantines were established in the first months, hitting the economy of the country. By April 2020, unemployment had reached 9%, a ten-year high. A wave of protests sparked in late May, mainly in Santiago, due to food shortages in certain sectors of the population. The Chilean GDP shrank by a 5.8% in 2020, the largest recession in 40 years in the country. Chile is the only country in the world with entry procedures such as requiring homologation of vaccines to travel to.

== Background ==
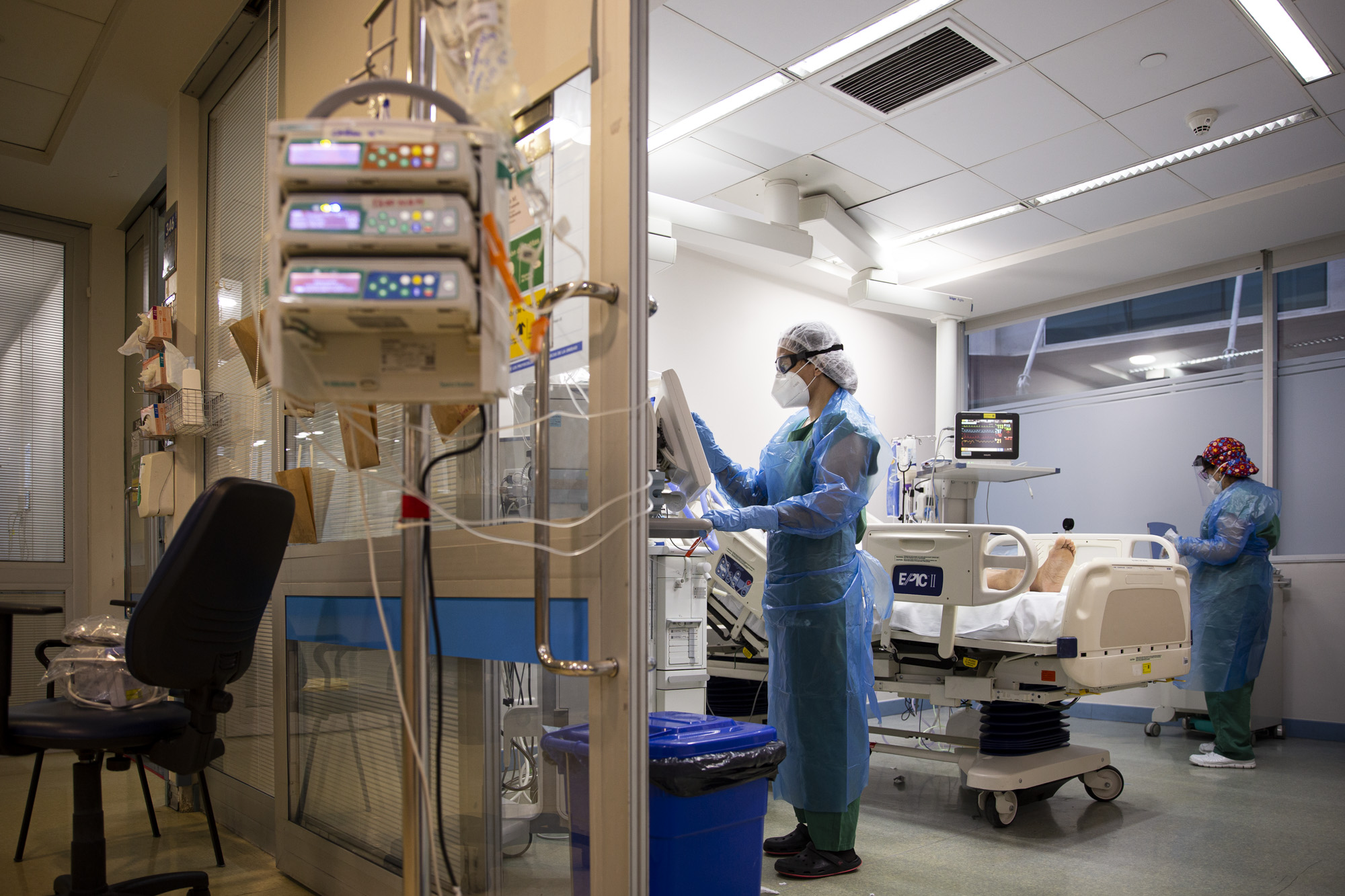
A COVID-19 patient being treated in the Catholic University Hospital, in Santiago.

On 12 January, the World Health Organization (WHO) confirmed that a novel coronavirus was the cause of a respiratory illness in a cluster of people in Wuhan, Hubei, China, which first came to the attention of the WHO on 31 December 2019.

The case fatality rate for COVID-19 was much lower than that due to the 2002–2004 SARS outbreak, which was due to another coronavirus, SARS-CoV-1, but the transmittability was significantly greater, leading to many deaths due to the large number of cases.

== Timeline ==
Cases

Deaths

=== 2020 ===
==== March ====
- 3 March: The Ministry of Health confirms the first case of the SARS-CoV-2 virus in Chile, making it the fifth country in Latin America to report such an instance after Brazil, Mexico, Ecuador and Argentina. Patient zero was identified to be a 33-year-old man living in San Javier and tested in Talca, Maule Region. He contracted the virus while on honeymoon in Southeast Asia.
- 4 March: The government confirms two more cases. One being patient zero's wife and the other being a 56-year-old woman who had traveled through several European countries, including Italy. She was also the first case in Santiago.
- 7 March: The Ministry of Health confirms the first case in a minor, a 17-year-old boy who had traveled to Europe with the third and fifth confirmed patients with the virus. The first case in Puerto Montt is identified.
- 8 March: 3 more cases are confirmed, including an 83-year-old woman who contracted the virus from a family member visiting her from New York, who later presented symptoms themselves and was diagnosed with COVID-19 upon return to the United States. This is considered the first case infected within Chile.
- 9 March: A 2-year-old infant is infected, becoming part of the Maule cluster, and the first case is declared in the Biobío Region. The Ministry of Health announces that it would start reporting new cases in a daily manner instead of case by case as they were confirmed.
- 11 March: The number of cases in the country reaches 23, 14 of them being in the Santiago Metropolitan Region, which became the first region in Chile with over ten confirmed cases. Most of them are located in the upper-class neighborhoods of Las Condes, Vitacura and Lo Barnechea.
- 13 March:
  - The first educational institution in Santiago begins a quarantine period, after a teacher working in Saint George's College tested positive to the virus.
  - President Sebastián Piñera announced a ban on public events with more than 500 people, in a government attempt to control the spread of COVID-19.
- 14 March: 18 new cases are confirmed, increasing the total number of confirmed cases to 61. The first cases are announced the regions of Antofagasta (2 cases), Atacama (1) and Aysén (1), the latter being an 83-year-old British tourist aboard a cruise ship that landed in Puerto Chacabuco after showing symptoms of COVID-19, having previously disembarked in Caleta Tortel. As a precaution, nearly 1,300 fellow-passengers on two cruises, along with the entire town of Tortel, are quarantined.
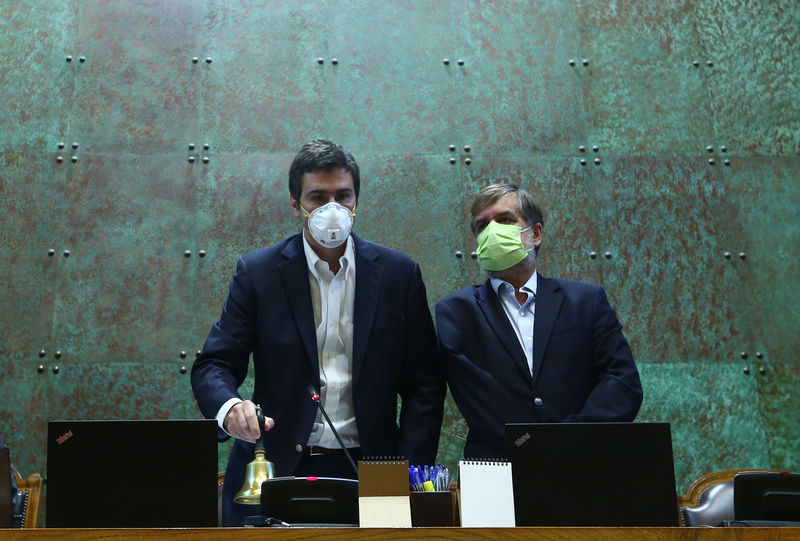
  The President and Vice President of the Chamber of Deputies of Chile using protective masks.
- 16 March: 81 new cases are confirmed in a single day, increasing the total to 156 confirmed cases. According to the definition of the Health Organization (WHO), the start of stage 4 of the pandemic begins, as President Piñera announces the closure of "all land, sea and air borders (...) for the transit of foreign people". Chilean nationals and permanent residents were allowed to enter after a mandatory 14-day quarantine.
- 17 March: A cluster of more than 20 cases is confirmed in Chillán. The virus had spread due to direct and indirect interpersonal contact within a gymnasium. Pedro Edmunds Paoa, mayor of Easter Island (Rapa Nui), announces that Mataveri Airport would close to avoid the virus reaching the isolated island.
- 18 March: The Government issues a 90-day state of catastrophe in an attempt to take greater control of spread of the virus, effective at midnight. The state of catastrophe was ultimately renewed by the President for the entire year.
- 19 March: The first day with more than 100 cases confirmed, bringing the total to 342. The same day, the couple who were the first reported cases of COVID-19 were deemed to have recovered, and were sent home to begin a post-recovery quarantine.
- 20 March: The mayors of Las Condes, La Reina and Vitacura declare a preventive quarantine for these sectors of the capital, where many confirmed cases of coronavirus had been recorded.
- 21 March: Health Minister Jaime Mañalich confirms the first death due to coronavirus infection in Chile, an 83-year-old woman from Santiago.
- 22 March: The number of total coronavirus cases reported reaches 632. A nationwide curfew is imposed between the hours of 22:00 and 5:00, while Easter Island (Rapa Nui) establishes a curfew from 14:00 to 5:00.
- 24 March: The first case in Easter Island (Rapa Nui) is reported, despite the measures taken days before.
- 25 March: The number of cases reaches 1,000. A total of 1,142 cases and 3 deaths are reported by the government.
- 26 March: Lockdown is introduced in 7 communes of Greater Santiago (Santiago, Independencia, Providencia, Ñuñoa, Las Condes, Vitacura, and Lo Barnechea).
- 27 March: Lockdown is introduced in Temuco and Padre Las Casas (Araucanía Region) due to high increase on new cases.

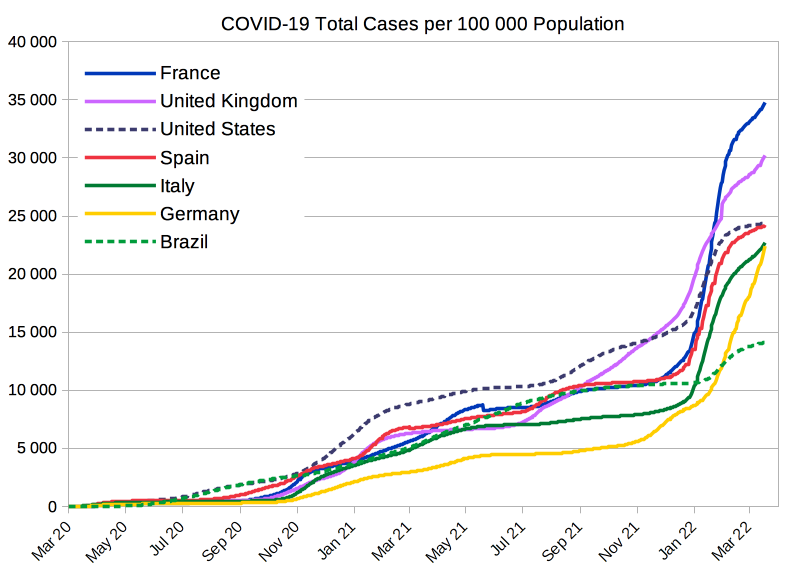
Cases per population in selected countries. Since May 2020, Chile became one of the countries with the largest numbers of infected people in the world.

==== April - May ====
- 19 April: In a cadena nacional, President Piñera announces a gradual process to adapt to a "new normal", including reopening schools by May 2020 and the return of public workers to office.
- 29 April: Minister Jaime Mañalich backs down on earlier plans for Immunity certificates, saying they would launch "release certificates" not certifying immunity instead. No certificate is eventually launched.
- 30 April: Joaquín Lavín, mayor of Las Condes, reopens the Apumanque shopping center in Santiago, which closes the following day.
- 15 May: Quarantine is extended to the entire Santiago Metropolitan area.
- 28 May: The Chilean government confirms a total of 86,943 cases, surpassing the number of official cases recorded in China, the source of the pandemic.

==== June ====
- 2 June: The Ministry of Health changes the definition of active cases, reducing them to a third. According to the Ministry, an active case is considered recovered 14 days after the start of symptoms and not since the detection of the virus, as it was considered before. The number of recovered cases disappears from the Ministry's daily reports.
- 3 June: The Ministry of Health implements new criteria to consider a death as related or due to COVID-19. The number of deaths the day before reaches a new maximum of 87 cases and a third of them (33) are incorporated due to the new criteria.
- 6 June: Santiago Metropolitan Region surpasses 100,000 cases, while the number of deaths recorded reaches 1,184 cases in the region.
- 7 June: Minister Jaime Mañalich announces that 653 additional deaths were not considered in previous reports and will be incorporated in the official reports in the following deaths. Adding those cases to the 1,637 official cases, the number of deaths reaches 2,190 cases.
- 9 June: The government announces a new change in the method of counting fatalities, identifying the cases using text mining on the death certificates issued by the Civil Registry and Identification Service. Although the new method identified more cases in the long term, it produced a lag in the daily reports. Owing to the change in methodology, 19 new deaths are reported.
- 10 June: The first complete report with the new methodology for identifying deaths is released, including 192 cases. The number of confirmed cases reaches 148,496 people.
- 13 June: A report released by Ciper informs the Statistics Department of the Ministry of Health reported more than 5,000 deaths related to COVID-19 to the World Health Organization, a smaller number than the number available in public reports. Undersecretary Paula Daza confirms there was a parallel count including suspected cases but it was not available in a daily basis and was not official. Minister Jaime Mañalich resigns and is replaced by Enrique Paris.
- 20 June: The Ministry of Health reports for the first time the number of suspected deaths related to COVID-19, informed to the WHO. A total of 7,144 deaths were released by the Department of Statistics and Health Information (DEIS). However, the government confirmed this number won't be released daily, reporting only the cases with positive PCR tests and cataloged as "COVID-19 related death" by the Civil Registry.

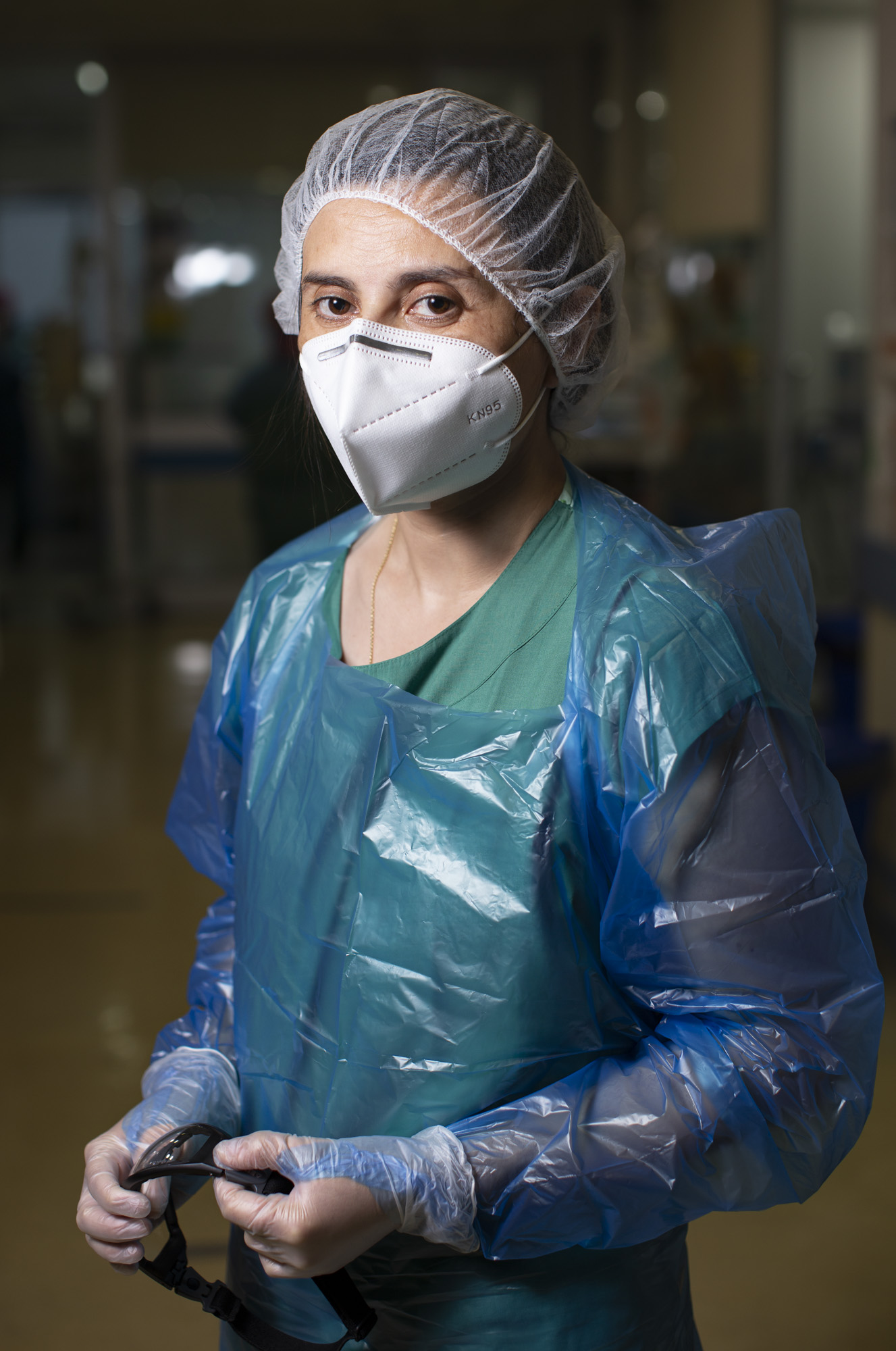
An intensive care physician in Santiago, Chile.

==== July - August ====
- 5 July: The total deaths due to COVID-19 (including confirmed and suspected) surpasses the 10,000 mark according to the weekly DEIS report.
- 17 July: The Ministry of Health changes the criteria for counting deaths due to COVID in their daily report. Since that day, it uses only the data of confirmed deaths with positive PCR tests according to the DEIS report, replacing the former criteria based on the Civil Registry. The change includes 1,057 additional deaths. However, suspected deaths without available PCR testing will continue being released weekly.
- 18 July: The government announces the "Paso a Paso nos cuidamos" ("Step by step we take care of ourselves") program with five different dynamic steps for lockdown lifting, establishing different restrictions to communes depending on the "step" they were: Step 1, Quarantine; Step 2, Transition (weekend quarantine); Step 3, Preparation; Step 4, Initial opening; and 5, Advanced opening.
- 16 August: After 143 days, the government announces an end to the lockdown in the entire commune of Santiago, the longest in the country at the moment.
- 19 August: Punta Arenas is declared under quarantine due to the increase in cases. The outbreak in the Magallanes Region became in the following months one of the worst in the country.

==== October - December ====
- 25 October: The 2020 Constitutional Plebiscite is held with record turnout. Several measures are taken to reduce exposure to the virus while people with a positive PCR test are not allowed to vote.
- 21 November: The number of COVID-19 related deaths (confirmed and suspected) surpasses 20,000 cases.
- 17 December: After one of the worst COVID-19 outbreaks is controlled, Punta Arenas is moved out of quarantine.
- 22 December: 36 cases are reported by the Chilean Army on the research Base General Bernardo O'Higgins Riquelme in the Chilean Antarctic Territory. These are the first reported cases on the continent.
- 24 December: 10,000 doses of Pfizer–BioNTech COVID-19 vaccine, the first COVID-19 vaccine approved in the country, arrive in Santiago. A vaccination campaign is launched, focusing primarily on emergency health workers. This was the first dispatch of vaccines from a total of 10 million doses acquired by the Chilean government from Pfizer-BioNTech.
- 30 December: The government announces a special permit for holidays with exception of communes under Step 1 (Quarantine) restrictions.

=== 2021 ===
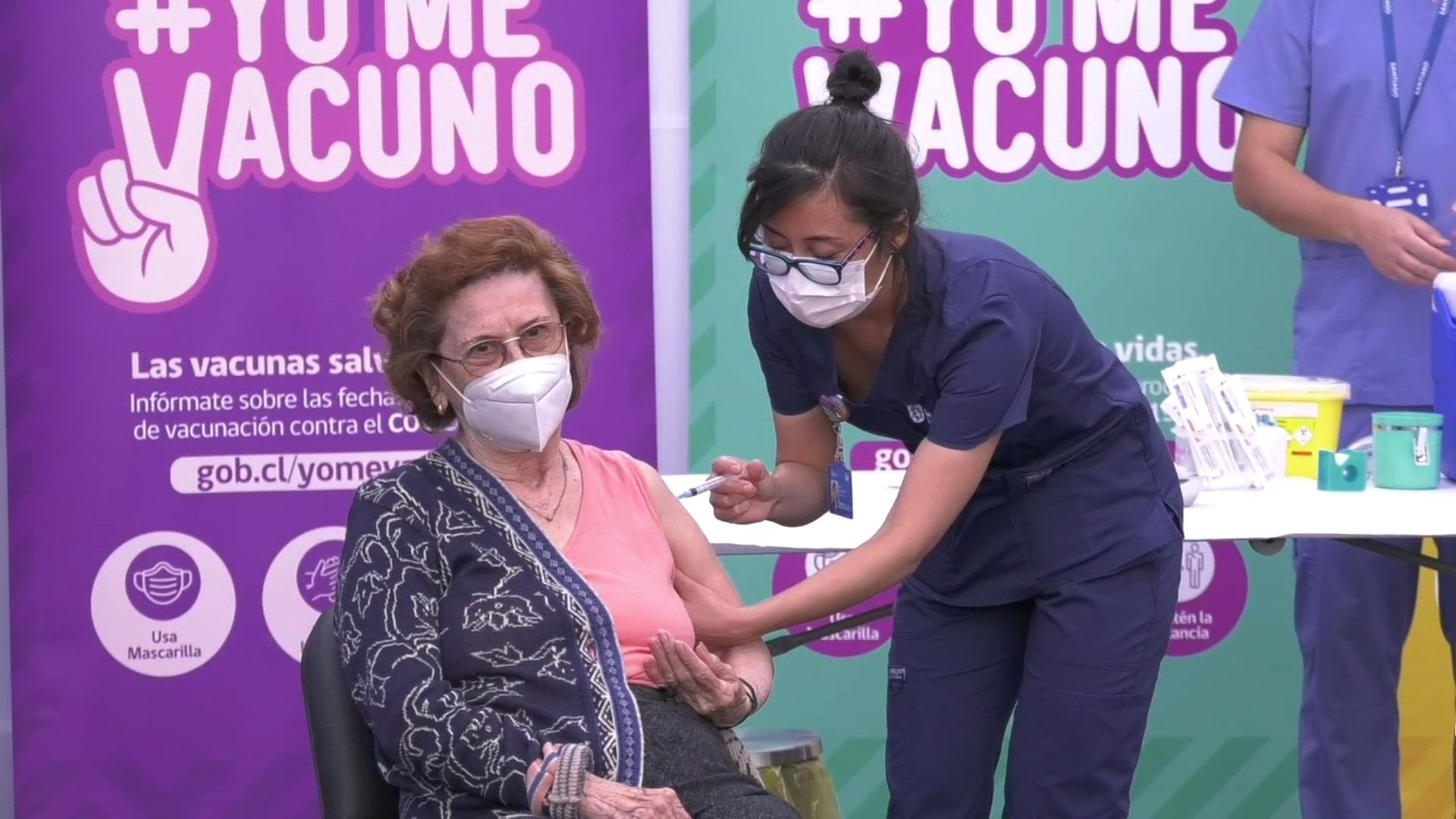
COVID-19 vaccination program in Santiago.

==== January - February ====
- 20 January: The Paso a Paso programme is modified and theaters, circuses and cinemas are allowed to operate in communes in Step 3 or above, although with reduced capacities.
- 3 February: After the initial program focusing on emergency health workers is completed, a mass vaccination program starts: 163,000 people were vaccinated, most over 90 years old, on the first day with CoronaVac produced by Sinovac Biotech.
- 19 February: Despite initial restrictions, casinos are allowed to operate with exception of communes under Step 1 restrictions.
- 20 February: The Ministry of Education confirms in-person school classes will start nationally on 1 March 2021 with face-to-face activities, even though several mayors and teachers' unions had public reservations with the announcement.

==== March ====
- 4 March: All the communes of the Greater Concepción (the third largest metropolitan area of the country) are placed under quarantine.
- 8 March: Quarantine is announced in La Serena, Coquimbo and Valparaíso.
- 10 March: Congress approves a 90-day extension of the state of catastrophe. Because the Constitution gives the President the power to declare the state of catastrophe for one year without Congress approval, it was the first time Sebastián Piñera had to request formally the extension.
- 11 March: All communes on the Santiago Metropolitan Region are declared under Step 2 after a spike in cases, with more than 5,500 diagnoses in the country (the largest since June 2020). Several modifications to the Paso a Paso program are reverted, strengthening restrictions under Step 2 and reestablished 22:00 curfew.
- 14 March: The Chilean Government announces new changes to the Paso a Paso program, allowing religious ceremonies to be held in open and closed spaces.
- 18 March: Quarantine is announced in Iquique, Viña del Mar, Santiago and several other communes. More than 9 million inhabitants will stay under total lockdown measures starting on 20 March 2021.
- 20 March: 7,084 cases are announced, the largest number of cases ever recorded in Chile at the time.
- 24 March: The Supreme Court of Chile declares that religious services cannot be restricted during lockdown due to freedom of religion.
- 25 March: The rest of the Santiago Metropolitan Region is placed under Phase 1 (Quarantine).
- 28 March: President Sebastián Piñera announces a proposal to reform the Constitution to move the local, regional and convention elections, originally scheduled for 10 and 11 April 2021, to 15 and 16 May 2021.
- 29 March: The Institute of Public Health confirms cases of community transmission of the Lineage B.1.1.7 (Alpha) and Lineage P.1 (Gamma) variants of COVID-19, and the first cases of the B.1.525 and B.1.526 variants are detected in tourists arriving at the country.

==== April - May ====
- 1 April:
  - The total number of cases surpasses 1 million.
  - The government announces several changes to the restrictions in place: borders will be closed for 30 days, with some exceptions for returning nationals and residents; curfew will start at 21:00, one hour earlier than before; work permits in communes under quarantine will be restricted only for essential activities, limiting administrative, financial and consulting activities only to remote work; markets and supermarkets will be allowed to sell only essential goods like food, medicine, and hygiene products, while other stores like clothing will be closed.
- 23 May: The government announces a "mobility pass" for fully vaccinated individuals (those who have been injected with the complete dosage of their respective vaccines and after a 14-day period) that allows holders to circulate inside the country despite quarantines, with the exception of circulating during curfew.
- 30 May: The Chilean Medical College withdraws from the COVID-19 Social Round Table due to serious discrepancies with the government. The medical association declared that government actions have been approved despite rejection from the different members of the roundtable composed by experts of different areas.

==== December ====
- 4 December: Valparaíso's Regional Ministerial Secretariat of Health (SEREMI) reported the first case of the Omicron variant in the country. SEREMI said the case was a traveler from Ghana who had arrived in the country on 25 November 2021.

=== 2022 ===
- 28 March: The mayor of the Patagonian town of Chile Chico announced the municipal council had decided to eliminate the mandatory use of face masks. This was soon contradicted by the local Ministerial Regional secretary (SEREMI) of the Ministry of Health who claimed nation-wide mandatory use was still in place.

== Statistics ==
=== Charts ===
==== Cases ====
View source data.
View source data.
View source data.

==== Deaths ====
View source data.
View source data.
View source data.

==== Health care situation ====
View source data.

==== Vaccination program ====
View source data.
View source data.

=== Distribution per region ===
- Confirmed cases and PCR+ deaths, updated as of 28 December 2021.
- All COVID-19 related deaths (including suspected deaths without PCR+), updated as of 24 December 2021.

Regions	Confirmed cases	Cases per 100,000	Confirmed PCR+ deaths	PCR+ deaths per 100,000	All COVID-19 deaths	All deaths per 100,000
Arica y Parinacota	29081	11535.04	546	216.57	678	268.93
Tarapacá	44825	11710.60	828	216.32	942	246.10
Antofagasta	66771	9651.02	1285	185.73	1559	225.34
Atacama	30727	9763.62	378	120.11	487	154.75
Coquimbo	54694	6541.59	1093	130.73	1367	163.50
Valparaíso	137747	7027.30	3630	185.19	4784	244.06
Santiago Metropolitan	751763	9252.39	19930	245.29	25765	317.10
O'Higgins	73131	7379.05	1628	164.27	2165	218.45
Maule	109594	9681.97	1858	164.14	2333	206.11
Ñuble	39399	7701.87	676	132.15	855	167.14
Biobío	167111	10044.56	2828	169.98	3477	208.99
Araucanía	103836	10236.77	1554	153.20	2097	206.73
Los Ríos	53625	13213.50	719	177.17	931	229.40
Los Lagos	99058	11112.13	1502	168.49	1833	205.62
Aysén	10282	9582.75	97	90.40	120	111.84
Magallanes and Chilean Antarctica	30105	16878.60	507	284.25	606	339.76
National total: 16 regions	1801795	9259.77	39059	200.73	50001	256.96

== Impact ==
For the first time since its creation, science observations at the European Southern Observatory (ESO) were paused as most of its staff were moved to their homes to avoid infection.

=== Events ===
On 2 March 2020, The CRU World Copper Conference in Santiago, the largest annual gathering of copper miners in the world, which was scheduled between 23 and 27 March 2020, was canceled due to concerns over travel risks associated with the coronavirus pandemic.

Large scale events such as Lollapalooza Chile (scheduled between 27 and 29 March 2020) and the XXI International Air and Space Fair (scheduled to take place between 31 March and 5 April), were preventively suspended.

=== Politics ===
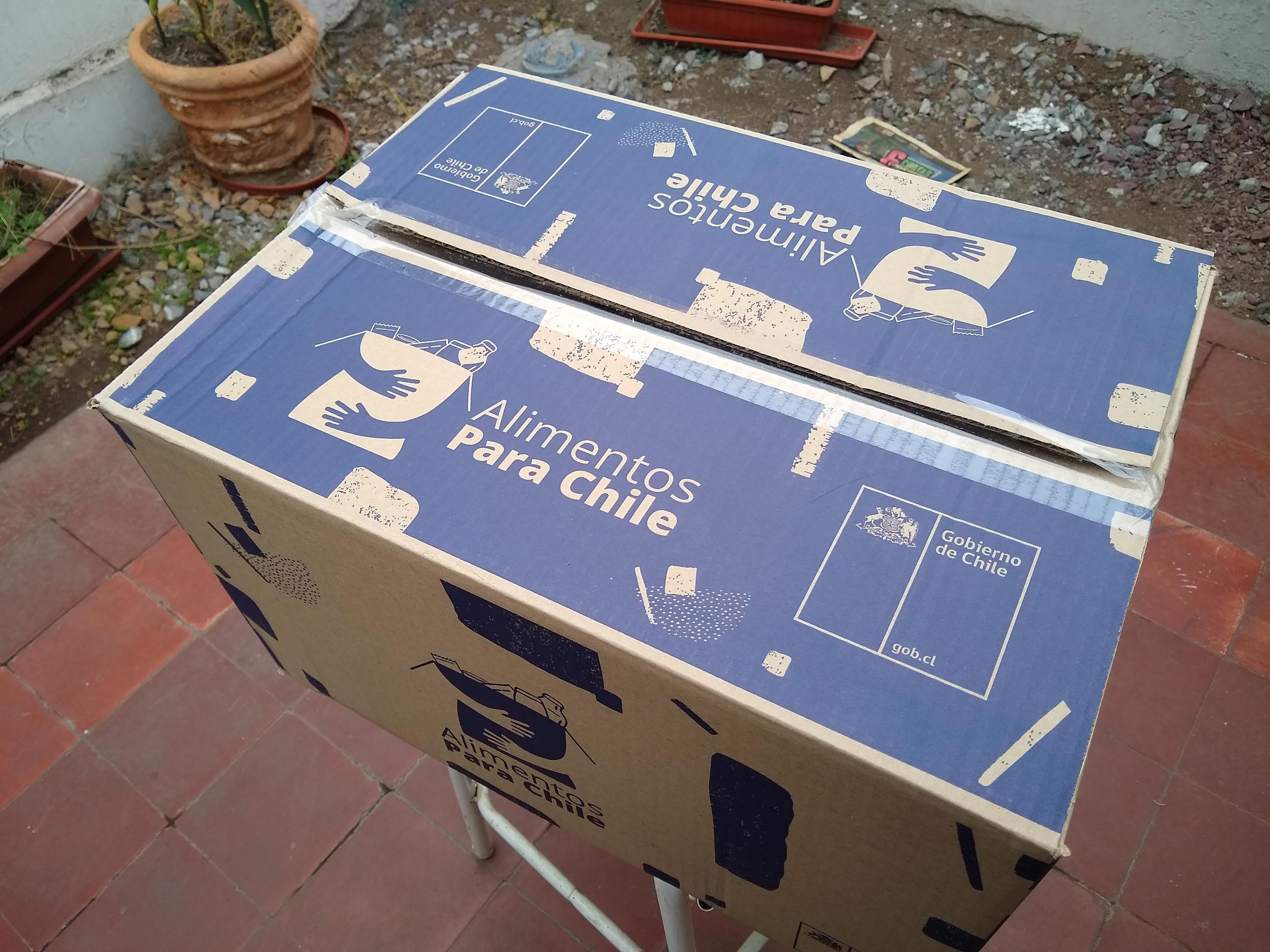
A food box delivered by the government as part of a relief plan in June 2020.

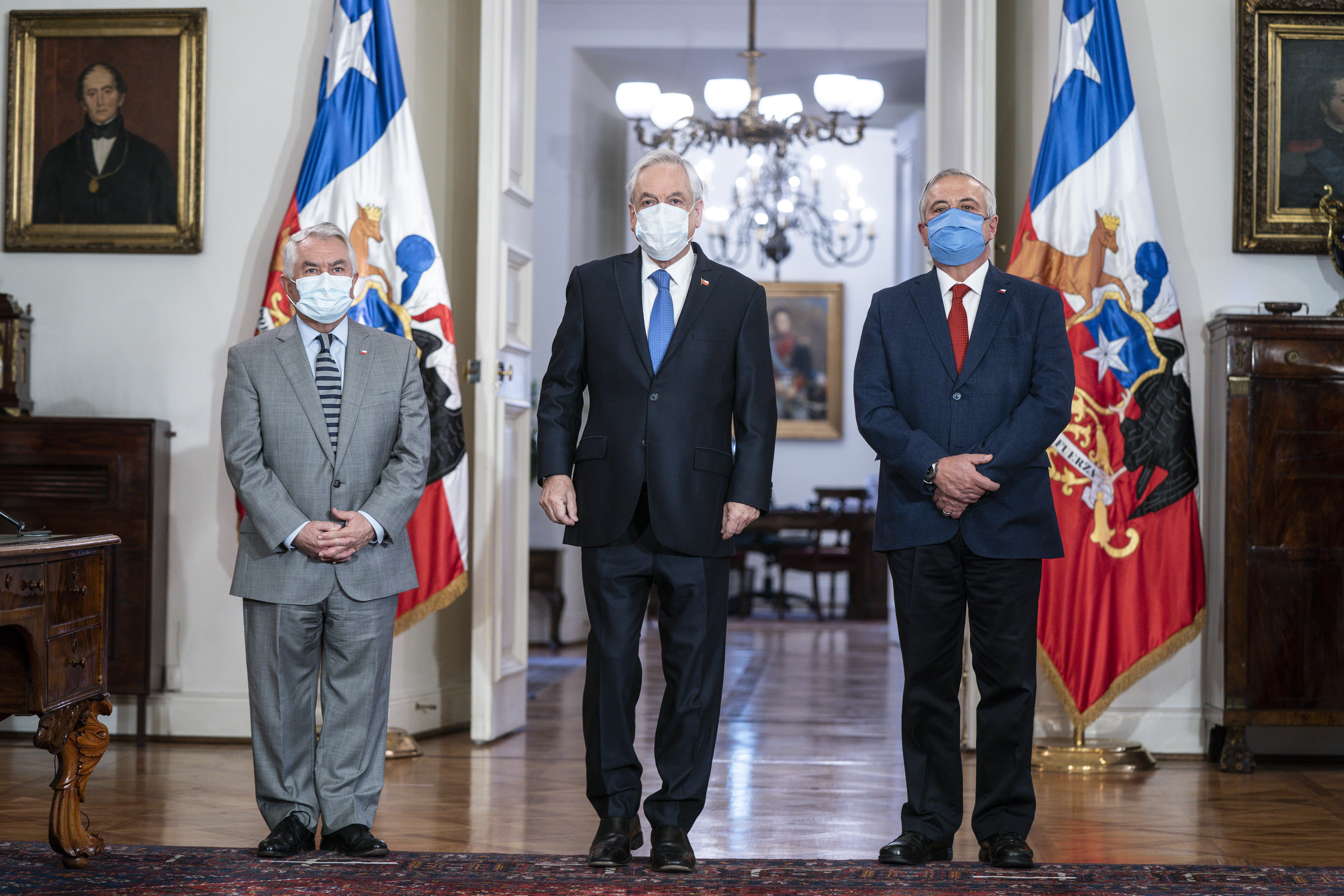
Sebastián Piñera (center) in the ceremony of designation of Enrique Paris (left) as minister of Health, replacing Jaime Mañalich (right).

A few months before the first cases of COVID-19, Chile had a series of massive protests and riots against the government of Sebastián Piñera, known locally as el Estallido social. Although not as massive as in October or November 2019, several protests continued in 2021 in the main Chilean cities. However, most of them had to come to a halt due to pandemic and the establishment of several partial lockdowns in Santiago and other cities. The situation was initially seen as an opportunity by the Piñera government to ease the protests and change of the government's priorities, focusing on the pandemic management instead of the protests' claims; internally, some government members even called the situation, "Saint Covid". In the few weeks after the start of lockdowns, government agencies erased most of the street art in downtown Santiago that was drawn during the protests and Piñera visited an empty Plaza Italia —the main site of protests— to take some pictures there, which was considered by many as a way of taunting the protesters under quarantine.

Once the number of COVID-19 cases started to rise in mid May 2020, the situation turned difficult for the Piñera administration. On one hand, the government had a difficult and tense relationship with scientists and healthcare professionals, especially the Chilean Medical College, who criticized the lack of transparent data, considered several measures taken as inadequate or belated, and denounced precarious and unsafe conditions for health workers. Mayors, including some of the governing political parties, openly disobeyed some measures from the government and implemented their own protection measures. Izkia Siches, president of the Chilean Medical College, became a popular figure, becoming one of the politicians with the largest approval rating in several polls.

On the other hand, the impact of the pandemic unleashed a serious economic crisis. Even thought the government offered different relief plans for companies and people, those plans were deemed insufficient and extremely restrictive, excluding several groups of affected people. This increased the distance with the political opposition and even with some members of the governing coalition. Owing to the perceived lack of support for the people affected by the pandemic, a group of left-wing politicians proposed a constitutional reform to allow people to withdraw a 10% of their pension funds without restrictions. While the government rejected the proposal, it echoed with the population and even some right-wing politicians supported the proposal. The proposal was approved by both chambers of the Congress in June 2021 by a supermajority, giving a serious blow to the Piñera administration. A second 10% withdrawal was approved in December and a third one was approved in April 2021. After the third project was approved with bipartisan support, Sebastián Piñera denounced it as unconstitutional and presented it to the Constitutional Court of Chile; however, the Court voted 7 to 3 to approve the constitutional reform, dealing another loss for the president.

The shocking defeat in the Court was considered for many as the political end of the Piñera government. According to several polls, the Piñera administration received its lowest level of support, reaching below 10%. As a way to confront the different controversies and issues, Piñera had to change several times the composition of its cabinet, becoming the most unstable government since the return of democracy in Chile; included in the sacked ministers due to the COVID-19 pandemic and its ramifications were the minister of Interior Gonzalo Blumel, the minister of Health Jaime Mañalich and the minister of Social Development Sebastián Sichel.

==== Postponement of elections ====
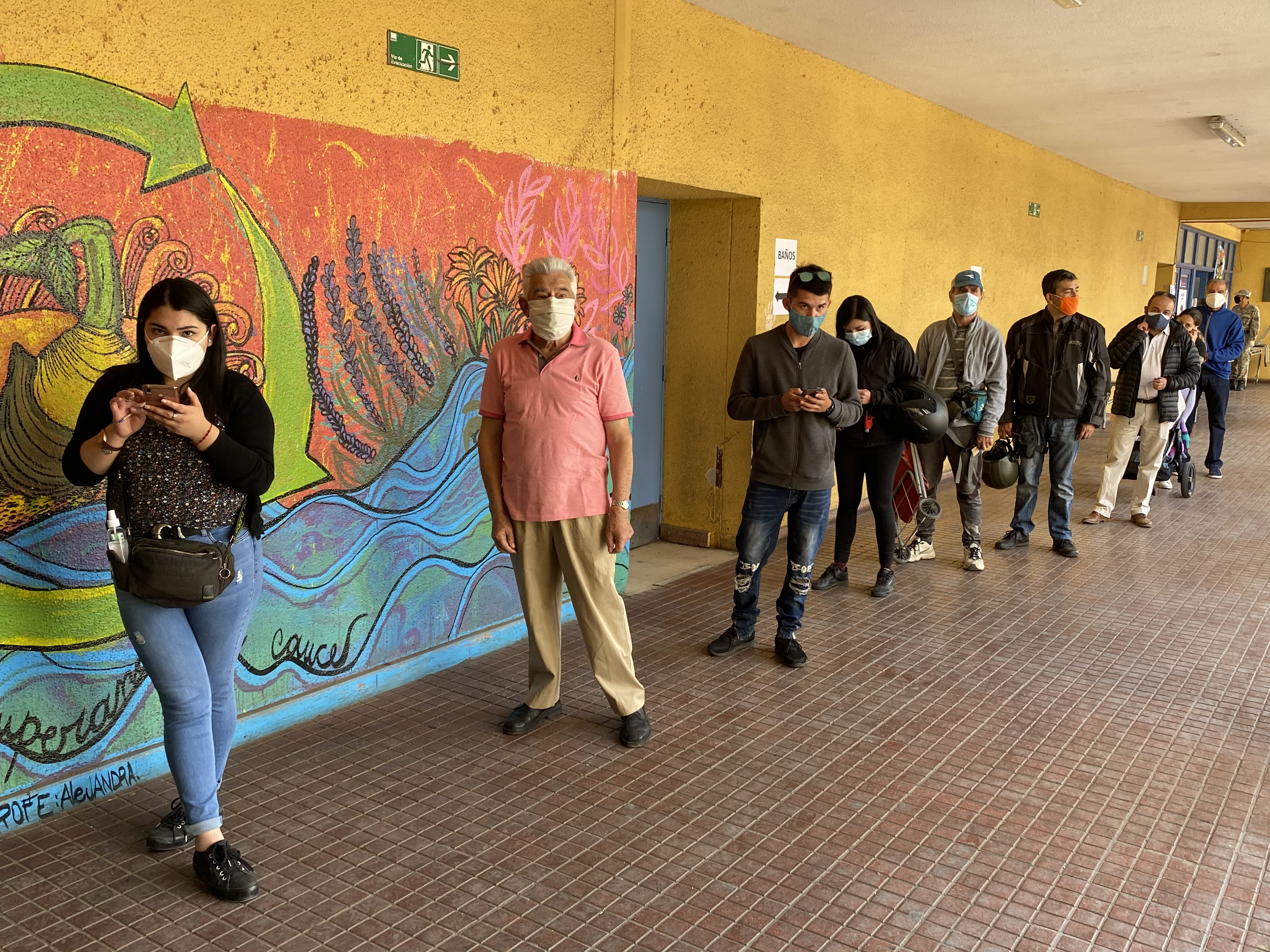
Long queues were registered in the 2020 Chilean national plebiscite due to a record turnout and to avoid agglomerations.

As a result of the Estallido social, a process to write a new Constitution was announced a few months before the first cases of COVID-19. The process included an initial referendum and, in case the process was approved by voters, new elections would elect the members of the Constitutional Convention that would lead the process.

The Chilean government initially stated that the initial plebiscite would be held in the original 26 April 2020 date under sanitary safeguard measures. However, on 19 March 2020, Chilean lawmakers reached an agreement to postpone the referendum until late October as safety concerns around the coronavirus pandemic took precedence over politics. The referendum was rescheduled for 25 October 2020, following formal approval by a two-thirds vote of congress on 24 March.

The municipal and regional elections, originally to be held on 25 October 2020, were moved to 11 April 2021, just like the election of the members for the Constitutional Convention eventually approved by the national referendum. Several safety concerns were raised for the April 2021 elections due to the large number of ballots and candidates available, which would increase the average time to vote and could potentially generate agglomerations. To avoid this issue, the government proposed to held the elections on two days, 10 and 11 April 2021, which was eventually approved by Congress. However, the rapid increase of cases in the last weeks of March forced the authorities to postpone the election for 5 weeks. The elections were held finally on 15 and 16 May 2021.

=== Economy ===
Unemployment related to the pandemic is believed to be the cause of a surge of illegal mining in Chile observed in 2020.

=== Wildlife ===
In a 2020 a series of rare sightings of pumas in the streets of the periphery of Santiago, Chile, were reported. Three pumas were sighted in late March–early April of which two were captured. In September a group of three pumas, including a cub and his mother were sighted in a Precordilleran neighborhood of Las Condes. As of 5 October Servicio Agrícola y Ganadero and the National Zoo had captured ten pumas in Santiago. Also on 5 October, the Ministry of Housing and Urban Planning and the Ministry of Agriculture launched a guide on "what to do and don't do" during and after puma sightings in cities.

According to Juan Valenzuela, sub-director of Servicio Agrícola y Ganadero in Santiago Metropolitan Region there are two hypotheses to explain the sightings. The first one is that pumas have moved into the city as a result of the lockdowns enforced due to the spread of the COVID-19 pandemic in Chile. A second hypothesis relates the sightings of pumas to a scarcity of food in their usual territories.

The sightings were part of a worldwide phenomenon of sightings of usually shy wildlife in urban areas during the COVID-19 pandemic.

== Notable cases and fatalities ==
- Luis Sepúlveda, Chilean writer and journalist resident in Spain. Died on 16 April 2020, in Oviedo, Spain.
- Sergio Onofre Jarpa, politician and former minister of Interior during the military dictatorship. Died on 19 April 2020, in Santiago.
- Nelson Orellana, mayor of Tiltil. Died on 15 June 2020, in Santiago.
- Bernardino Piñera, Catholic bishop and uncle of Chilean president Sebastián Piñera. Died on 22 June 2020, in Santiago.
- Hernán Pinto, former mayor of Valparaíso. Died on 29 July 2020, in Viña del Mar.
- Mario Gutiérrez, guitarist and founder of Los Ángeles Negros. Died on 20 January 2021.
- Tomás Vidiella, actor. Died on 10 March 2021, in Santiago.
- Cristián Cuturrufo, jazz trumpeter. Died on 19 March 2021, in Santiago.
- Cristopher Mansilla, track and road cyclist. Died on 10 May 2021.

== See also ==
- COVID-19 pandemic by country and territory
- COVID-19 pandemic in South America
- 2020 in Chile
