= Paula Daza =

Chilean surgeon, pediatrician and politician

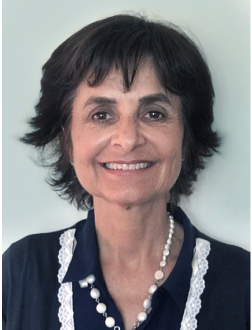
- Official portrait, 2018

Undersecretary of Public Health
- In office 11 March 2018 – 28 November 2021
- President: Sebastián Piñera
- Preceded by: Jaime Burrows
- Succeeded by: María Teresa Valenzuela

Personal details
- Born: 25 January 1960 (age 66) Santiago, Chile
- Party: Independent
- Education: University of Chile; University of the Andes (MHA); Technion Israel Institute of Technology (PgD)

Paula Graciela Daza Narbona (born 25 January 1960) is a Chilean surgeon, pediatrician and politician who served as Undersecretary of Public Health. Daza was a consultant for Evelyn Matthei and Andrés Allamand during the 2013 Chilean general election partly drafting the health care plan of their presidential campaigns. During the COVID-19 pandemic a criminal complaint was filed against Daza and other members of the government, which accused them of negligence during the pandemic. Daza is responsible for implementing one of the most drastic vaccine passports during the COVID-19 pandemic in Chile.

In 2021, she left the government to support José Antonio Kast's candidacy in the 2021 Chilean general election ballotage.

In 2022 she was incorporated to the University for Development.
