= Healthcare in Chile =

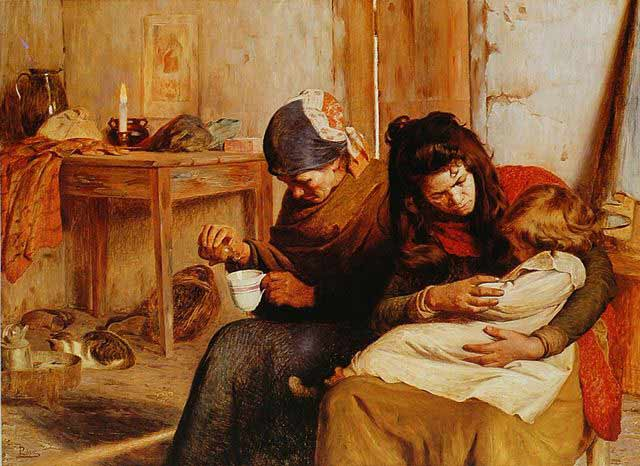
El niño enfermo, The sick child, painted by the Chilean painter Pedro Lira.

The healthcare system in Chile operates as a mixed system, combining both public and private provision of health services. The public system, known as Fondo Nacional de Salud (FONASA), is funded through taxes and provides free or subsidized care to those who cannot afford private health insurance. The private system consists of various insurance providers, called Instituciones de Salud Previsional (ISAPREs), and private healthcare facilities, which offer more extensive services to those who can afford to pay.

== History ==
Life expectancy development since 1900.

Chile was among the first Latin American countries to introduce a healthcare system for the middle class, funded through mandatory salary deductions, similar to the Bismarckian welfare model. In the 1950s, the country established a national healthcare system. However, during the final decade of the military dictatorship (1973–1990), a two-tier system emerged, allowing individuals to opt out of the public system and purchase private health insurance from ISAPREs. These private insurers provided access to private clinics and hospitals, often at significantly higher costs. The public healthcare sector was maintained under FONASA.

Following the return to civilian rule in 1990, public funding for hospitals increased, but no major reforms were implemented for over a decade. In the early 2000s, President Ricardo Lagos introduced reforms to strengthen the public sector. By 2015, private healthcare coverage had declined to 19% of the population, down from a peak of 26%. A significant reform during this period was the introduction of the Explicit Guarantee System (Acceso Universal con Garantías Explícitas, or AUGE), which guarantees access, opportunity, quality, and financial coverage for 80 high-mortality conditions. While the AUGE system helped reduce mortality rates for communicable diseases and myocardial infarction, it did so at the expense of chronic disease management. In 2010, the Constitutional Court of Chile ruled that ISAPREs' premium adjustments based on age and gender were discriminatory, though no alternative mechanism was proposed. Public satisfaction with the healthcare system has declined since 2007, reaching its lowest point in 2014.

== Structure of the healthcare system ==
All workers and pensioners in Chile are required to contribute 7% of their income toward health insurance, except for the poorest pensioners, who are exempt. Those who do not join an ISAPRE are covered by FONASA. FONASA also covers individuals receiving unemployment benefits, uninsured pregnant women, dependents of insured workers, people with disabilities, and those classified as poor or indigent.

FONASA beneficiaries can access both public and private healthcare facilities, provided the private facility or professional is affiliated with FONASA at one of three pricing levels. Since September 1, 2022, public healthcare services have been free for all FONASA beneficiaries.

ISAPREs offer varying levels of coverage based on income and medical risk, which is assessed using factors such as age, family medical history, and sex. However, in 2010, the Constitutional Court ruled that risk assessment based on sex and age was unconstitutional. ISAPRE participants pay an average of 9.2% of their income toward health insurance, with the additional 2.2% being voluntary to enhance benefits. Nearly 60% of ISAPRE participants are in the top two income quintiles, while only 7% are in the bottom quintile. ISAPREs often provide shorter wait times and discounted services through provider networks, whereas FONASA relies on lower-cost public hospitals, offering broader benefits but with longer wait times.

Over 50% of the public healthcare budget is funded through taxation, which supports FONASA and the public social security system. ISAPREs, on the other hand, rely solely on member contributions to cover expenses.

== AUGE plan ==
The AUGE plan (also known as GES, or Garantías Explícitas en Salud) guarantees access, opportunity, quality, and financial coverage for 80 high-mortality conditions. The guarantees include:

1. Access: Patients can receive care from a network of providers near their residence.
2. Opportunity: Care must be provided within pre-established time limits for both initial consultation and follow-up.
3. Quality: Services must meet technical standards based on medical evidence (enforceable from July 1, 2013).
4. Financial Coverage: Copayments cannot exceed 20% of the treatment cost, with an annual cap of one month's family income.

== Healthcare resources ==
As of December 22, 2014, Chile had 425 hospitals, administered by either the Regional Ministry of Health (SEREMI) or the National Health Care System. SEREMI oversees 54% (230) of hospitals, while the National Health Care System manages the remaining 46% (195). Approximately 30% (127 hospitals) are located in Santiago, the capital and most populous region, which accounts for 36% of the country's population.

== Beneficiaries ==
As of 2017, the distribution of healthcare beneficiaries in Chile was as follows:

System	Affiliates	%
Fonasa	13,926,475	75.61
Isapre	3,393,805	18.43
Total pop.	18,419,192	100.00

== See also ==
- Ministry of Health (Chile)
- List of hospitals in Chile
- Water supply and sanitation in Chile
