= Jaime Mañalich =

Chilean physician (born 1954)

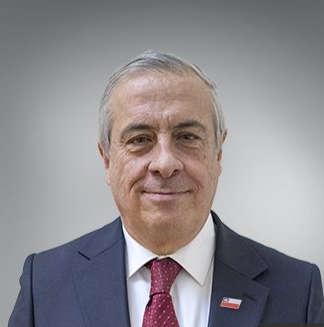

Minister of Health
- In office 13 June 2019 – 13 June 2020
- President: Sebastián Piñera
- Preceded by: Emilio Santelices Cuevas
- Succeeded by: Enrique Paris
- In office 11 March 2010 – 11 March 2014
- President: Sebastián Piñera
- Preceded by: Álvaro Erazo
- Succeeded by: Helia Molina

Personal details
- Born: 7 June 1954 (age 72) Santiago, Chile
- Party: Amarillos por Chile
- Education: University of Chile; McMaster University
- Occupation: Politician
- Profession: Physician

Jaime José Mañalich Muxi (born 7 June 1954) is a Chilean physician (nephrologist), and former Health Minister.

He held the position during the first Piñera government (2010-2014) and assumed the role again in June 2019 until he was replaced in June 2020 amidst criticism over his handling of the COVID-19 pandemic in Chile.

In January 2023, he officially joined Amarillos por Chile.

== Family and education ==
Mañalich was born in Santiago on 7 June 1954. He is the eldest son of Jaime Ramón Mañalich Fajardo and Monserrat Muxi Segura, Spanish Catalan immigrants who arrived in Chile as a result of the Spanish Civil War.

He completed his primary education at Escuela N.º 48 in Ñuñoa and his secondary studies at the Liceo Experimental Manuel de Salas, also in Ñuñoa. In 1972 he entered the Faculty of Medicine of the University of Chile, where he shared classes with future President Michelle Bachelet, who at the time was an active left-wing student leader. He graduated as a medical doctor with a specialization in nephrology.

He has been married since 1979 to teacher María Cristina Raffo, and is the father of three children: Juan Pablo, a lawyer and professor of criminal law at the University of Chile; Felipe, an advertising professional who has won eleven Lions at the Cannes Lions International Festival of Creativity; and Francisco Javier, a musician specializing in the viola da gamba and vocal performance.

=== Personal life ===
At the age of eight, he was run over by a car, resulting in the loss of a kidney and his spleen. He is also the godfather of one of the children of politician Karla Rubilar, who served alongside him during the second administration of President Piñera.

He is known as a football enthusiast; his favorite team is FC Barcelona, which, according to close acquaintances, he follows closely. He is also an active user of Twitter, and his preferred hobby is reading.

== Professional career ==
He began his professional career at the Hospital José Joaquín Aguirre in Santiago, where he worked for fifteen years. He later completed a master's degree in Health Research Methodology at McMaster University in Canada. According to statements he made in a 2012 interview, he also holds degrees in clinical epidemiology.

In 1995 he became medical director of Clínica Las Condes, an institution where Sebastián Piñera served as director until 2009 and as a shareholder until early 2010. He also acted as the personal physician of the Piñera family. During his administration, the clinic obtained accreditation from the Joint Commission International (JCI).

He participated in a 2007 research project conducted by Fundación Expansiva and Universidad Diego Portales, together with the School of Public Health of the University of Chile, where he was tasked with analyzing the implementation of the Health Reform in Chile. He also served as an academic at the University of the Andes.

In October 2017 he assumed the position of general manager of Clínica Las Condes. In March 2018 he joined the board of the Teletón Foundation.
