= Fondo Nacional de Salud =

Funding branch of the Chilean Ministry of Health

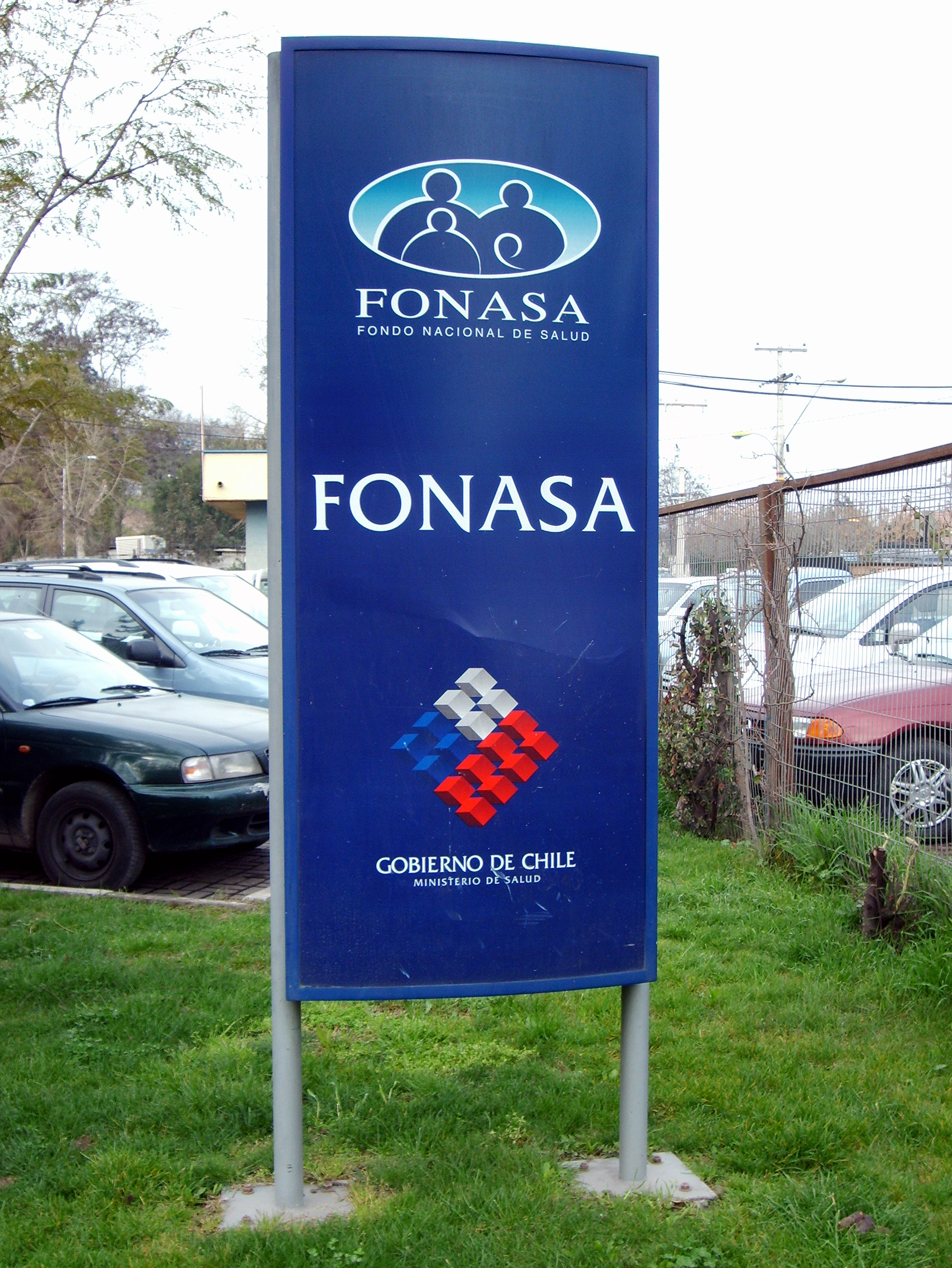
FONASA, the funding branch of the Ministry of Health.

Fondo Nacional de Salud, also known as FONASA, is the financial entity entrusted to collect, manage and distribute state funds for health in Chile. It is funded by the public (7% of employees' monthly income). It was created in 1979 by Decree Law No. 2763.

FONASA is part of the NHSS and has executive power through the Chilean Ministry of Health. FONASA headquarters are in Santiago and decentralized public service is conducted by various Regional Offices.

Twelve million beneficiaries benefit from FONASA. It provides health benefits and health care by professionals and institutions.

== Beneficiaries ==
Joining the FONASA contributor as a beneficiary is done automatically when a person has not opted to join private insurance through ISAPRE when:

- An employee allocates 7% of gross income for FONASA, regardless of the social welfare system to which it belongs (INP and AFP)
- Unemployed worker receives unemployment allowance granted by the mayor of the residence
- INP and AFP Pensioner and allocates 7% of its contribution to FONASA

FONASA beneficiaries are:

- Dependents of contributors. Includes children up to 18 years of age or students under 24 years
- Pregnant women until the sixth month of the birth of child
- Pension beneficiaries of invalidity and old age
- People with mental disabilities, any age, provided they are not causing family subsidy (SUF)

Beneficiaries by December 2009.

System	Affiliates	%
Fonasa	12,504,226	73.49
Isapre	2,705,917	15.90
Total pop.	17,014,491	100.00

== Choice of care ==
All beneficiaries are placed into four sections according to their income.

There are two types of care arrangements:

- Modality of Institutional Care: Delivered in public health facilities (clinics, rehabilitation centers and hospitals CDT).
- Free Choice Modality: Delivered by professional and private health facilities and who have signed an agreement with FONASA. Public hospitals are included in free choice modality if the recipient chooses their physician and/or are hospitalized in a private room. The focus of this modality is paid through a Health Care Bonus. The value of the bonus depends on the level of registration of the professional or health facility where they attend. There are three levels with 1 being the cheapest and 3 being the most expensive.

== See also ==
- Healthcare in Chile
