= María Begoña Yarza =

Chilean politician

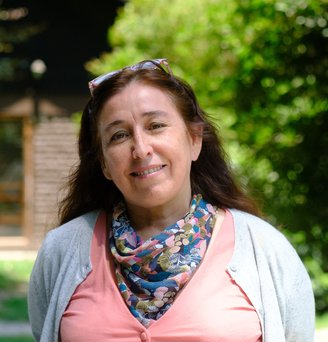

Minister of Health
- In office 11 March 2022 – 6 September 2022
- President: Gabriel Boric
- Preceded by: Enrique Paris
- Succeeded by: Ximena Aguilera

Personal details
- Born: 20 February 1964 (age 62) Rengo, Chile
- Party: Independent
- Education: University of Havana; University of Chile; Pompeu Fabra University
- Occupation: Politician
- Profession: Physician

María Begoña Yarza Sáez (born 20 February 1964) is a Chilean politician and physician who served as Minister of Health.

== Biography ==
=== Family ===
She was born in the Chilean commune of Rengo on 20 February 1964, the youngest of three siblings, to the marriage of Ruth Adriana Sáez Parada and Simón Segundo Yarza Celis, better known as “Monto” Yarza, a folklorist and politician affiliated with the Socialist Party (PS), who served as councillor and mayor of the locality.

She lived there until 1974, when, due to the military dictatorship of General Augusto Pinochet then in power, her family went into political exile, first to Argentina and later to Cuba. She returned to Chile in 1988, in the final years of the regime.

=== Education ===
She completed her primary and secondary education in Cuba, attending the Alamar Basic Secondary School, and pursued higher education in medicine at the University of Havana.

She qualified as a physician and surgeon, with her degree revalidated by the University of Chile in 1990. She later completed a postgraduate diploma in public management at Adolfo Ibáñez University and a master's degree in public health at Pompeu Fabra University in Spain in 2004.

=== Professional career ===
From July 2004 to August 2008, she served as medical deputy director of San Borja Arriarán Hospital. From 2008 to 2009, she worked as head of the “Care Processes Unit” in the Department of Hospitals of the Ministry of Health, during the first government of President Michelle Bachelet. Likewise, between July 2009 and July 2018, she served as director of Dr. Exequiel González Cortés Hospital and as director of the South Metropolitan Health Service between 2010 and 2011.

In parallel, she served as academic director of the Academic Committee of the Chilean Society for Quality of Care from 2016 and as director of quality and clinical management at Clínica Santa María.

From 1996 to 2009, she worked as an academic at the Faculty of Medicine of the University of Chile, and since 2009 she has served as an academic at the Faculty of Medicine of Diego Portales University (UDP). She has been an active collaborator of the Medical College of Chile, working in its Department of Labour Affairs. In 2017, the Medical College awarded her the Professional Career Award.

She is a member of the National Productivity Commission of the Ministry of Economy, Development and Tourism, where she has acted as an advisor on productivity reports related to operating rooms.
