= Emilio Santelices =

Chilean physician and politician

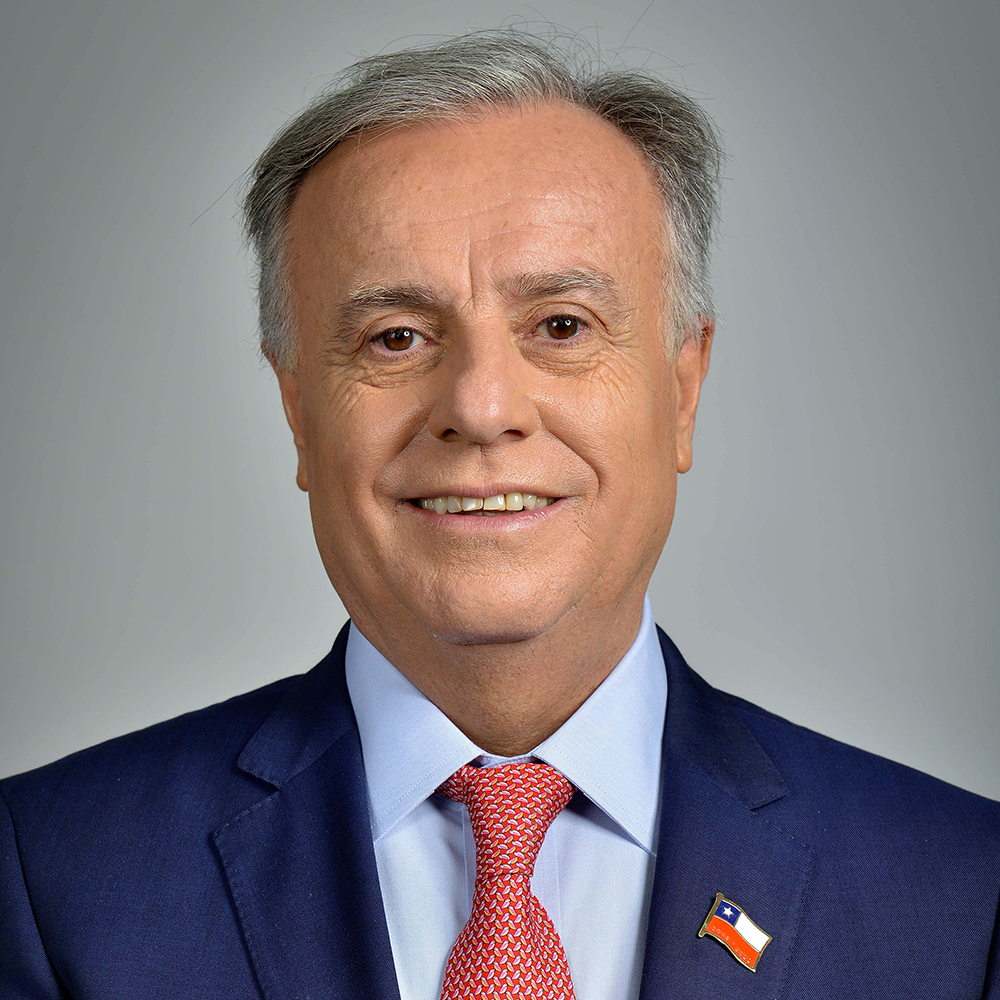

Minister of Health
- In office 11 March 2018 – 13 June 2019
- President: Sebastián Piñera
- Preceded by: Carmen Castillo Taucher
- Succeeded by: Jaime Mañalich

Personal details
- Born: 25 March 1955 (age 71) Lo Barnechea, Chile
- Spouse: Carol Thomas
- Children: 5
- Education: Pontifical Catholic University of Chile
- Profession: Physician

Emilio Gabriel Santelices Cuevas (Santiago March 25, 1955) is a Chilean doctor and academic. Between March 2018 and June 2019 he served as Minister of Health of the second government of Sebastián Piñera.

== Biography ==
He is the son of César Santelices Pinto and Emilia Eliana Cuevas Gómez. He studied at the Colegio Hispano Americano. After which he studied medicine at the Pontifical Catholic University of Chile and specialized in cardiovascular anesthesiology and transplantation in the same university. Later, he obtained a doctorate in public health from the University of Chile, a diploma in health institution administration from the same university, and an MBA from Tulane University.

He served in various positions at the Clínica Las Condes, in addition to being an academic at the University of Chile, and chairman of the board of the Corporación Médicos para Chile.

Between 2010 and 2014, he was a cabinet advisor to the Ministry of Health on issues of quality improvement and evaluation for hospitals and primary health centers. In 2018 he was appointed Minister of Health by Sebastián Piñera, position he left in June 2019, being replaced by Jaime Mañalich.

== Public life ==
He held various positions at the Chilean Air Force Clinical Hospital, and served as an academic at the University of Chile. He was also chairman of the board of Corporación Médicos para Chile.

Between 2010 and 2014, he served as a cabinet advisor at the Ministry of Health (Minsal), focusing on hospital quality improvement and evaluation. During the same period, he was head of the Ministry’s Department of Strategic Development.

In March 2018, he was appointed Minister of Health by President Sebastián Piñera. He left office in June 2019 amid controversies, including the regulation on conscientious objection under the three-grounds abortion law and issues related to his shareholdings in the information technology company Sonda. He was replaced by Jaime Mañalich.

In March 2020, he returned to the Ministry of Health as a COVID-19 advisor to the Metropolitan Central Health Service (Servicio de Salud Metropolitano Central).
