= Juan Carlos Concha =

Chilean politician (1933–2025)

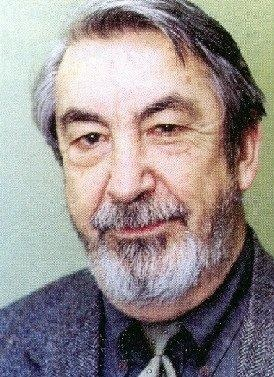

Minister of Public Health
- In office 14 August 1971 – 3 November 1972
- Preceded by: Oscar Jiménez Pinochet
- Succeeded by: Arturo Jirón

Personal details
- Born: 28 September 1933 Santiago, Chile
- Died: 8 January 2025 (aged 91) Santiago, Chile
- Party: MAPU (1969–1973); PCCh (1973–2025)
- Education: University of Chile
- Occupation: Surgeon

Juan Carlos Concha Gutiérrez (28 September 1933 – 8 January 2025) was a Chilean politician. A member of the Popular Unitary Action Movement and the Communist Party of Chile, he served as Minister of Public Health from 1971 to 1972.

Concha died in Santiago on 8 January 2025, at the age of 91.
