= Alfredo Piwonka =

Chilean politician (1887–1942)

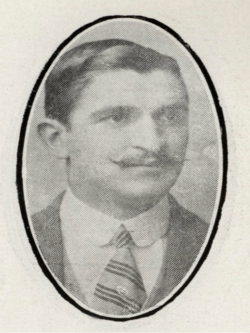

Member of the Senate
- In office 15 May 1926 – 6 June 1932
- Constituency: 5th Provincial Grouping

Member of the Chamber of Deputies
- In office 15 May 1921 – 11 September 1924
- Constituency: Caupolicán

Personal details
- Born: 26 December 1887 Osorno, Chile
- Died: 17 March 1942 Santiago, Chile
- Party: Radical Party
- Spouse: Elvira Moreno Fredes
- Education: University of Chile
- Occupation: Agricultural engineer, politician

Alfredo Piwonka Gilabert (26 December 1887 – 17 March 1942) was a Chilean agricultural engineer and politician. A member of the Radical Party, he served as deputy and later as senator, and held several ministerial posts during the presidency of Arturo Alessandri.

== Early life and education ==
Piwonka was born in Osorno, Chile on 26 December 1887, to Ricardo Piwonka Richter and Sofía Gilabert Roselot.

He studied at the Liceo de Aplicación secondary school, and later graduated from the University of Chile as an agricultural engineer. He went on to work in agriculture, including owning the "Cruz Roja" gristmill in San Fernando, and running the Santa Adela farm in Teno.

== Political career ==
Piwonka joined the Radical Party in 1930 and remained a member until 1938.

From 1921 to 1924, he was elected and served as Deputy for Departamento de Caupolicán.

He later served as Senator for the O’Higgins, Colchagua, and Curicó from 1926–1934, and sat on the Standing Committees on Government, Agriculture, Mining, Industrial Development and Colonisation, and Internal Police.

On 6 June 1932, the National Congress was dissolved after a socialist coup d'état that established the short-lived Socialist Republic of Chile.

=== Ministerial career ===
Following the election of Arturo Alessandri, Piwonka held several ministerial offices. He served as Minister of Development from 24 December 1932 until he became Minister of the Interior on 8 May 1933, a position he held until 19 April 1934.

Piwonka served as the Minister of Public Health from 8 May 1933 to 19 April 1934. Simultaneously, he served as the interim Minister of Development (8 to 9 May 1933) and Minister of Labor (6 October to 8 November 1933).

== Personal life ==
Piwonka was married to Elvira Moreno Fredes, and had three daughters.

During his life, Piwonka was a member of various organisations. On 25 April 1892, he was a member of the University Delegation in the Department of Copiapó, and in 1922 he joined the Club de La Unión. He was also a member of the Sociedad Nacional de Agricultura.

He died in Santiago on 17 March 1942.
