= Helia Molina =

Chilean physician, educator, and politician

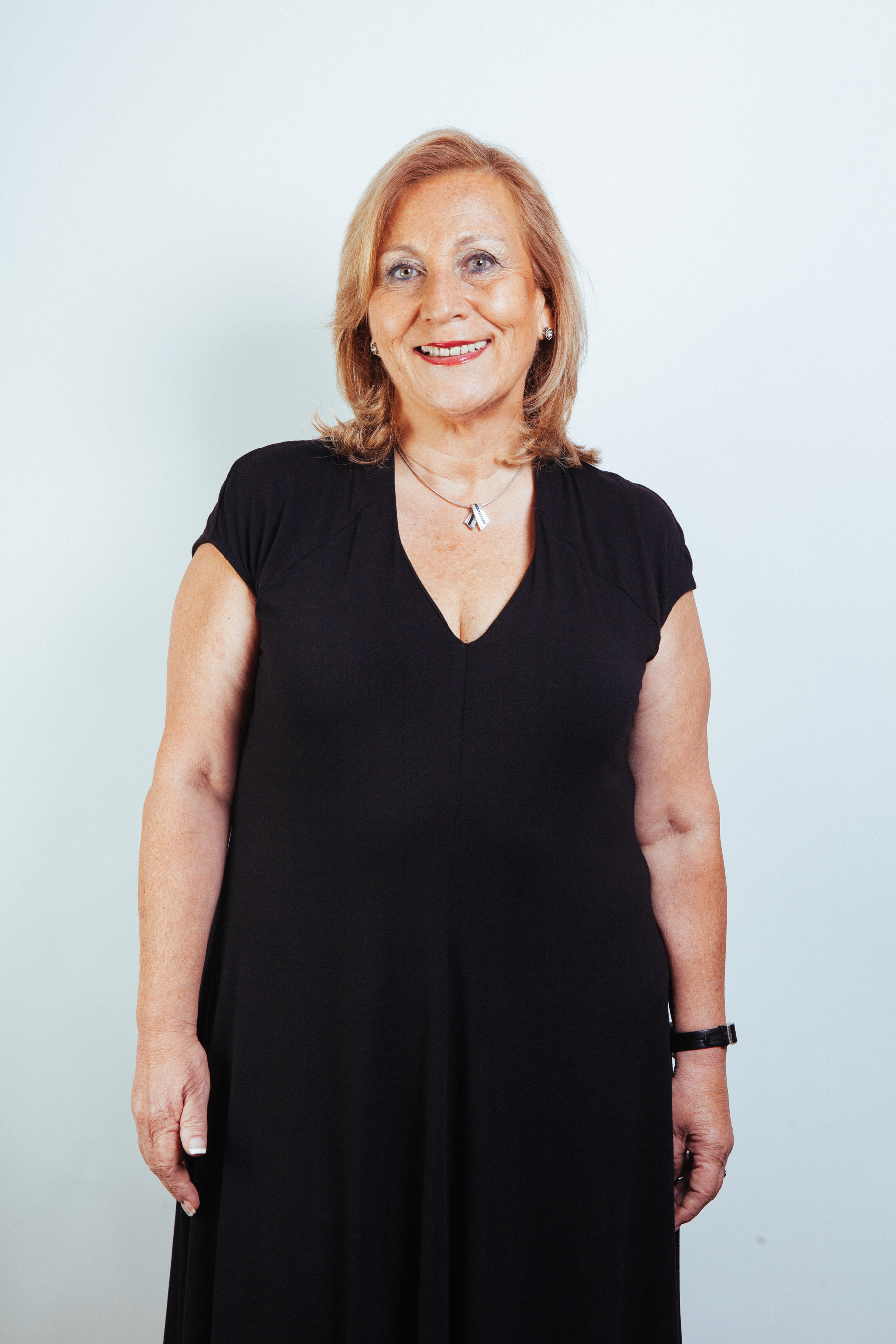

Member of the Chamber of Deputies of Chile
- In office 11 March 2022 – 11 March 2026
- Preceded by: Creation of the District
- Constituency: District 10

Minister of Public Health of Chile
- In office 11 March 2014 – 30 December 2014
- President: Michelle Bachelet
- Preceded by: Jaime Mañalich
- Succeeded by: Carmen Castillo Taucher

Personal details
- Born: Helia Águeda Molina Milman; 2 April 1947 (age 79) Santiago, Chile
- Party: Party for Democracy
- Education: University of Chile
- Occupation: Physician, educator, politician

Helia Águeda Molina Milman (born 2 April 1947) is a Chilean physician, educator, and politician. She served as Minister of Public Health in 2014, during the second government of Michelle Bachelet. She is currently a professor at the University of Santiago's Faculty of Medical Sciences.

She has worked as a consultant at the Pan American Health Organization (PAHO), World Health Organization (WHO), UNICEF, Inter-American Development Bank (IADB), and other international agencies.

== Professional career ==
Helia Molina was born in Santiago on 2 April 1947. She received a degree in medical sciences at the University of Chile in 1971, and the title of surgeon at the same university in 1973. She obtained a master's degree in public health at the University of Chile in 1999.

She has been dean of the University of Santiago's Faculty of Medical Sciences since 2017, in addition to serving as an academic of that house of studies. From 1977 to 1990 she taught at the Pontifical Cateholic University (PUC) Associate Teaching Unit of Pediatrics at the Dr. Sótero del Río Hospital. Molina has coordinated and participated in several national and international studies and projects. She is the author of numerous publications in books, technical documents, and scientific journals in the field of children and their rights, as well as public policies for early childhood development.

In conjunction with teaching, Molina was a clinical doctor at the Sótero del Río Hospital's pediatric service until 1990. From 1991 to 1995, she served as director of primary care for the Oriente Metropolitan Health Service. From 1995 to 1999 she advised the Ministry of Health on primary care and health promotion. In the field of scientific societies, she was director, vice-president, and the first woman to be president of the Chilean Pediatric Society (1983–1987) and director of the Chilean Epidemiology Society (1999).

Between 2000 and 2004 she worked at the PAHO as a regional adviser on children's health for Latin America and the Caribbean. Back in Chile, she returned to the PUC, and in 2006 she became a member of the Children's Council created by President Michelle Bachelet in her first government. In that role, Molina joined the Ministry of Health, where she served as head of the Division of Health Policies and Promotion in the Undersecretariat of Public Health from 2006 to 2010, and from 2008 to 2010 she was executive secretary of Chile Crece Contigo, a public policy initiative for child protection.

From 2005 to 2008 she was a member of the Knowledge Network on Child Development, within the framework of the WHO Commission on Social Determinants of Health.

== Political career ==
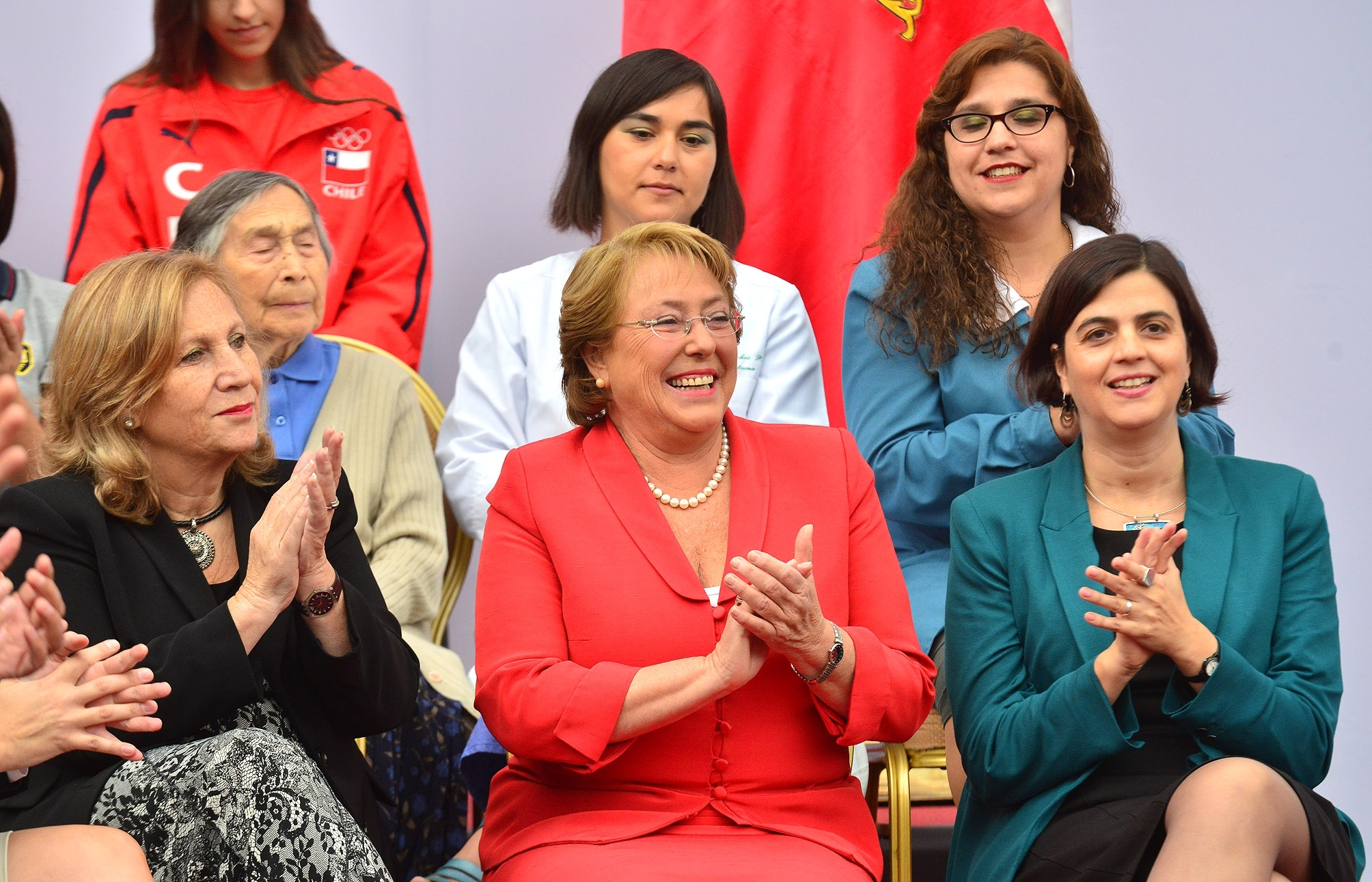
Molina (left) with Michelle Bachelet and Claudia Pascual

=== Minister of Public Health ===
In January 2014, Molina was appointed Minister of Public Health by the then president-elect, Michelle Bachelet, for her second government. She assumed the Health portfolio on 11 March 2014.

On 30 December 2014, in an interview given to the evening paper La Segunda, she said that "in all cuicas [private, in pejorative terms] clinics, many conservative families have gotten their daughters abortions," pointing out a double standard where access to abortions was available to rich citizens but prohibited for the poor. This sparked a controversy, which led the government to issue a communiqué stating that the minister's statements were strictly personal. On the same day, Molina presented her resignation from office, which was accepted by the president.

=== 2016 mayoral candidacy ===
During May 2016, Helia Molina entered the municipal primaries for mayor of Ñuñoa for the New Majority. Her campaign was officially launched on 28 May 2016, from the Plaza Villa Olímpica in Ñuñoa. In the primary election on 19 June, Molina obtained 35.17% of the votes, being nominated as candidate for mayor for the New Majority.

In the election, Molina obtained 22,373 votes (35.7%), losing to the incumbent, Andrés Zarhi, who received 30,944 votes (49.4%).

== Other activities ==
- Partnership for Maternal, Newborn & Child Health (PMNCH), Member of the Board

== Selected publications ==
- Molina Milman, Helia; Cordero, Miguel A.; Silva, Verónica (November 2008). "De la sobrevida al desarrollo integral de la infancia: Pasos en el desarrollo del sistema de protección integral a la infancia" [From Survival to Comprehensive Childhood Development: Steps in the Development of the Comprehensive Protection System for Children]. Revista Chilena de Pediatria (in Spanish). 79 (1): 11–17.
- Molina, Helia. "Discapacidad en la infancia: Desafío de la salud pública" [Childhood Disability: Public Health Challenge] (PDF) (in Spanish). UNICEF Chile.
- Benguigui, Yehuda; Molina Milman, Helia, eds. (2004). Encuentro Internacional de Desarrollo Infantil en el marco de los Objetivos de Desarrollo del Milenio (ODM) [International Meeting on Child Development Within the Framework of the Millennium Development Goals (MDG)] (PDF) (in Spanish). Pan American Health Organization. ISBN 92-75-32608-8.
- Lee, Albert; Kiyu, Andrew; Molina Milman, Helia; Jimenez, Jorge (2007). "Improving Health and Building Human Capital Through an Effective Primary Care System". Journal of Urban Health. 84 (84): 75–85. doi:10.1007/s11524-007-9175-5. PMC 1891639. PMID 17356902.
- Molina Milman, Helia; Castillo, Claudio A.; Torres Sansotta, Andrea; Valenzuela Delpiano, Paula; Murray, John (7 December 2018). "Scaling up an early childhood development programme through a national multisectoral approach to social protection: lessons from Chile Crece Contigo". The BMJ. 363 (363) k4513. doi:10.1136/bmj.k4513. PMC 6282756. PMID 30530499.
