= Carmen Castillo Taucher =

Chilean physician and health minister

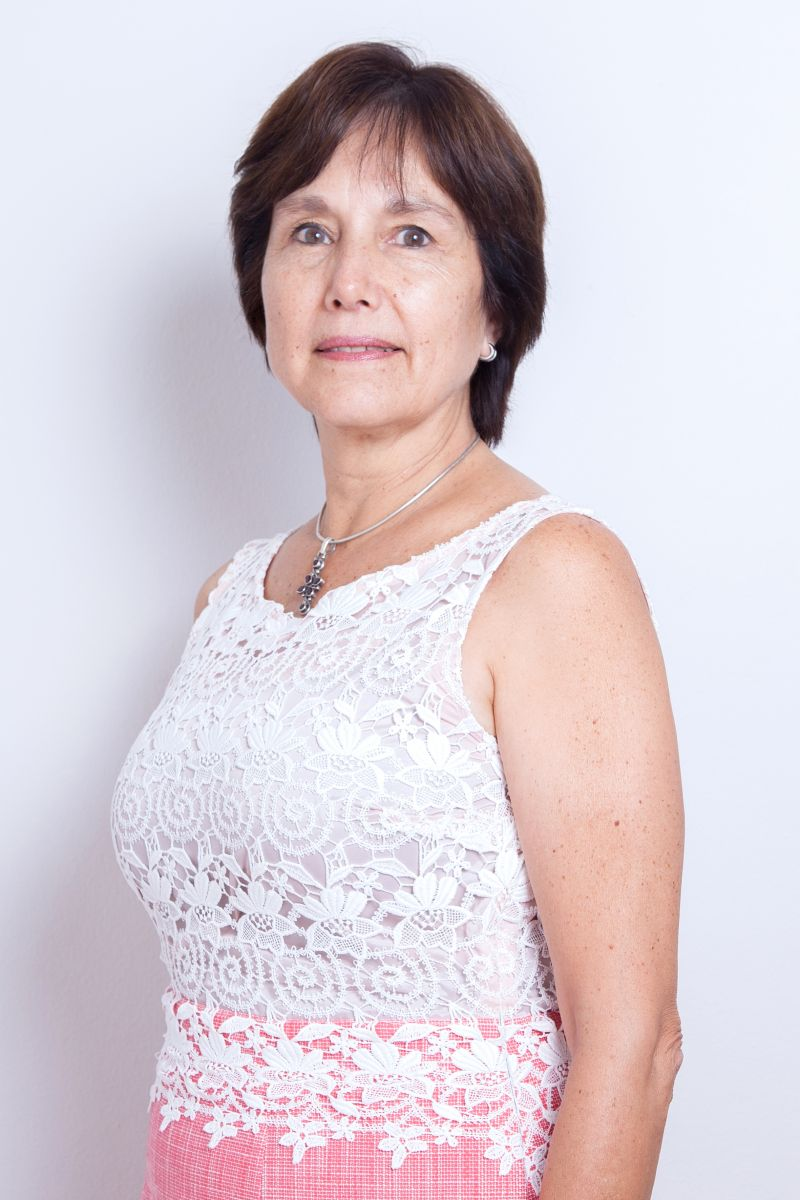

Minister of Public Health of Chile
- In office 23 January 2015 – 11 March 2018
- President: Michelle Bachelet
- Preceded by: Helia Molina
- Succeeded by: Emilio Santelices

Personal details
- Born: Carmen Gisele Castillo Taucher; 1954 (age 71–72)
- Party: Independent
- Education: University of Chile
- Occupation: Surgeon, politician

Carmen Gisele Castillo Taucher (born 1954) is a Chilean surgeon and academic. She was the Minister of Public Health during the second government of Michelle Bachelet.

== Biography ==
Carmen Castillo Taucher studied at the University of Chile's Faculty of Medicine, graduating as a surgeon. Later, she completed a Master in Public Health degree with a mention in epidemiology at the same university.

She has worked in the public health system as deputy director of the Dr. Luis Gajardo Guerrero Hospital in San Felipe (1988–1989), director of the Aconcagua Health Service (2000–2010), and technical director of the Dr. Jorge Ahumada Lemus Family Health Center in Santa María (2010–2013).

In 2013 she took over as director of the San Felipe Campus of the University of Valparaíso. The same year, she joined the "Presidential Advisory Commission for the Study and Proposal of a New Model and Legal Framework for the Private Health System", convened by President Michelle Bachelet to reform the system of Social Security Institutions.

On 23 January 2015, Bachelet appointed her Minister of Public Health, replacing Helia Molina, who had resigned on 30 December 2014. She served in this post for the remainder of Bachelet's administration, leaving office on 11 March 2018.

In November 2019, Castillo was one of 690 academics and health professionals to sign an open letter calling for a unified National Health Insurance system.
