= Medical College of Chile =

Professional association of Chilean physicians

The Medical College of Chile (Spanish: Colegio Médico de Chile; also known as Colmed) is a professional association of Chilean physicians. According its statutes the Chilean Medical College has the objectives of promoting the improvement, protection, development and rationalization of the healthcare profession.

== History ==
The Medical College of Chile was founded in 1948 with the objectives of strengthening the Chilean public health system, improving education for new medical practitioners and improving doctors' working conditions. Since 1960, the Medical College has been involved in defining the courses that prospective medical practitioners in Chile must follow in order to be accredited within the country. They do this by liaising with the Chilean Ministry of Health, the Association of Medical Schools and the Medical Association of Chile.

The Medical College has also publicly campaigned against Chilean Police procedure and tactics of firing rubber bullets towards the upper body and head as a crowd control method, citing the large number of eye injuries that their members have to treat as a result. In addition, they also protest on environmental issues and mining concerns that they believe may risk peoples' health. They do make recommendations to the government on how to improve public health by suggesting policy changes. They also take part in making public health announcements. Former presidents include Ricardo Vacarezza, Enrique Accorsi, Juan Luis Castro, Pablo Rodríguez, and Enrique Paris.
