= Enrique Paris =

Chilean physician and politician

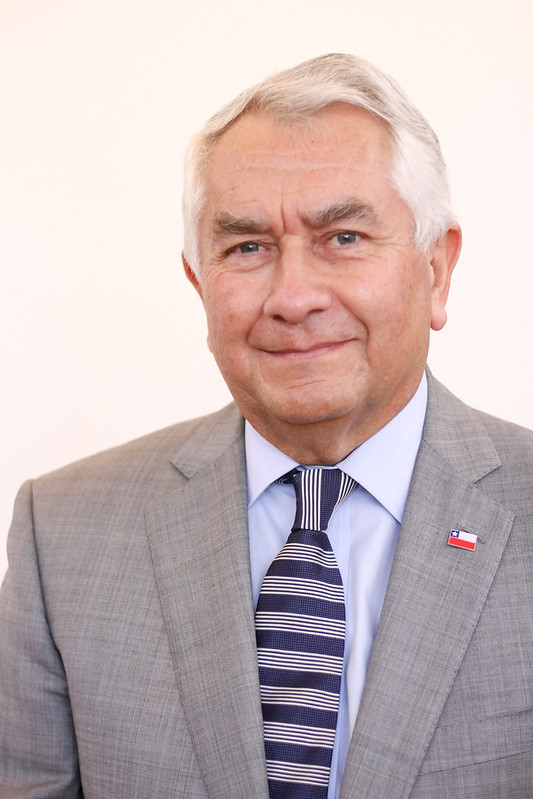

Minister of Health
- In office 13 June 2020 – 11 March 2022
- President: Sebastián Piñera
- Preceded by: Jaime Mañalich
- Succeeded by: María Begoña Yarza

Personal details
- Born: 3 September 1948 (age 78) Puerto Montt, Chile
- Children: Juan Pablo Paris
- Education: Pontifical Catholic University of Chile
- Occupation: Physician, politician

Oscar Enrique Paris Mancilla (born 3 September 1948) is a Chilean physician and politician who served as Minister of Health.

== Biography ==
Born and raised in Puerto Montt, he is the fourth child of Enrique Paris Maldonado, a volunteer firefighter with Bomberos de Chile, and Carmen Mancilla Elgueta, a pharmaceutical chemist by profession. His siblings are Carmen Luz (early childhood educator), Ximena (physician), and Jaime (architect).

His parents were members of the Christian Democratic Party and owned the "Farmacia Angelmó" and "Farmacia Chile," both located in Puerto Montt. In that same commune, his father served as campaign chief for Eduardo Frei Montalva in the 1964 Chilean presidential election.

During his medical studies, he also participated in theater and sports activities. He was a member of a folk music group formed by classmates, Los del San Javier, during the era of Los Cuatro Cuartos.

Before beginning university, he reportedly expressed to friends that, if he did not study medicine, he would become a Jesuit missionary. In 1965, he ran for president of his school's student council, losing the election.

=== Professional career ===
Between 1969 and 1970, he studied pathological anatomy under Helmar Rosenberg at the Pontifical Catholic University of Chile. Years later, in December 2009, Rosenberg was charged in connection with the investigation into the death of Eduardo Frei Montalva.

In 1991, while working at Hospital Sótero del Río, he met a child who frequently required medical attention. He later assumed responsibility for the child's care and, on 21 December 1994, formalized the adoption at the Civil Registry in Providencia.

In an interview published in April 2022, he publicly acknowledged his homosexuality, stating that "having a different sexual orientation was very complex," particularly while studying in a Catholic school environment.

On 17 May 2022, he was declared an honorary citizen ("Hijo Ilustre") of Providencia.

== Education ==
He studied at Colegio San Francisco Javier in Puerto Montt. In 1969, he moved to Santiago to study medicine, graduating as a physician (M.D.) from the Pontifical Catholic University of Chile.

After completing his studies, he began his medical career in Chiloé. Between 1975 and 1979, he served as a rural general practitioner in Achao. He was director of the rural health post in Curaco de Vélez, director of Achao Hospital, head of the child health program, and head of the adult medicine program.

Between 1979 and 1982, he returned to Santiago and completed a pediatric residency at Hospital Luis Calvo Mackenna through the University of Chile. In 1984, he traveled to Belgium to pursue pediatric intensive care studies at the Catholic University of Louvain in Brussels.

He also completed specialization training in toxicology at the National Capital Poison Center of Georgetown University, United States, and in postoperative cardiac intensive care at the Cardio-Surgical Intensive Care Unit of the University of Michigan Hospital.
