= Ministry of Health (Chile) =

Government ministry of Chile

- Ministerio de Salud de Chile
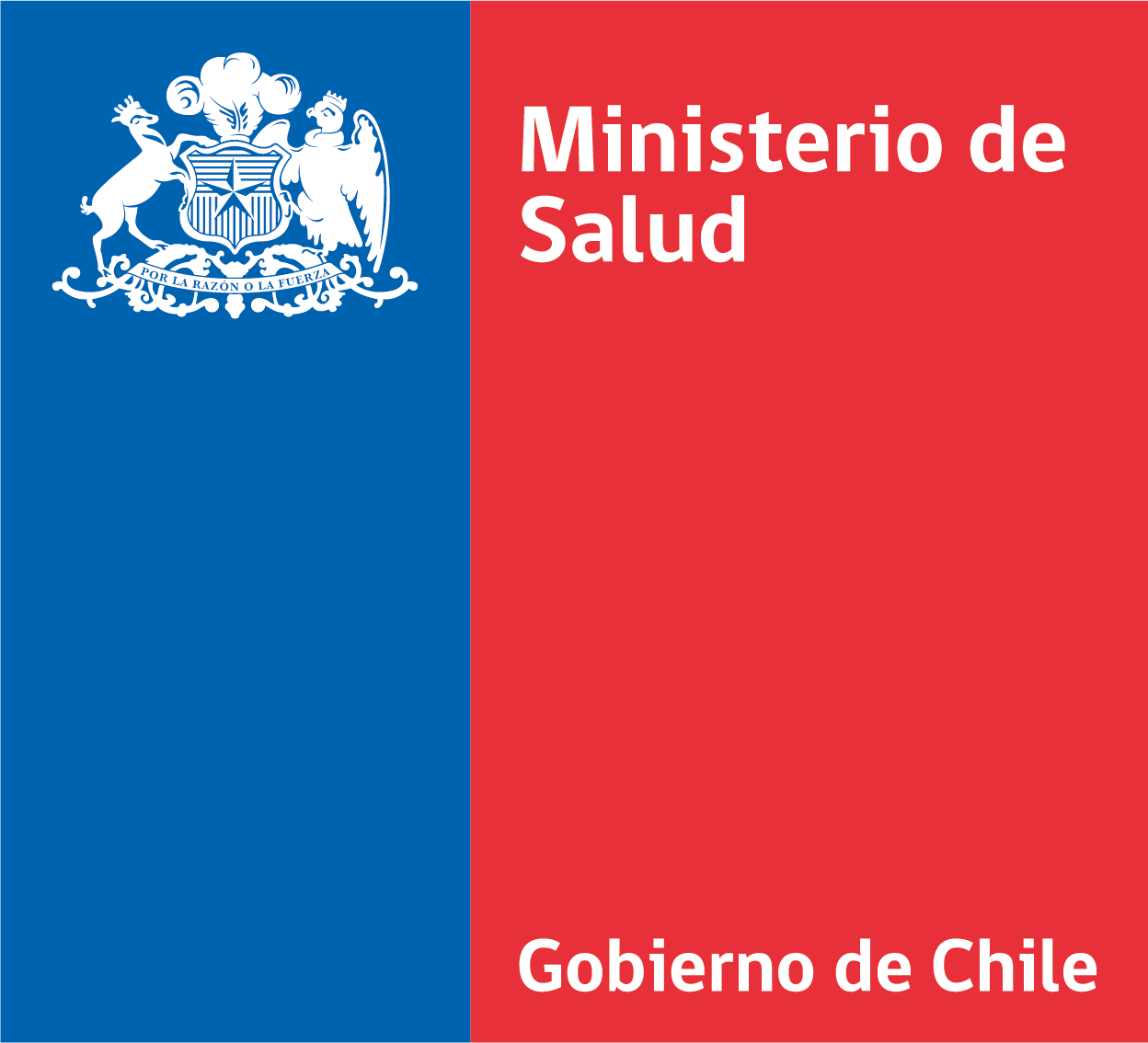

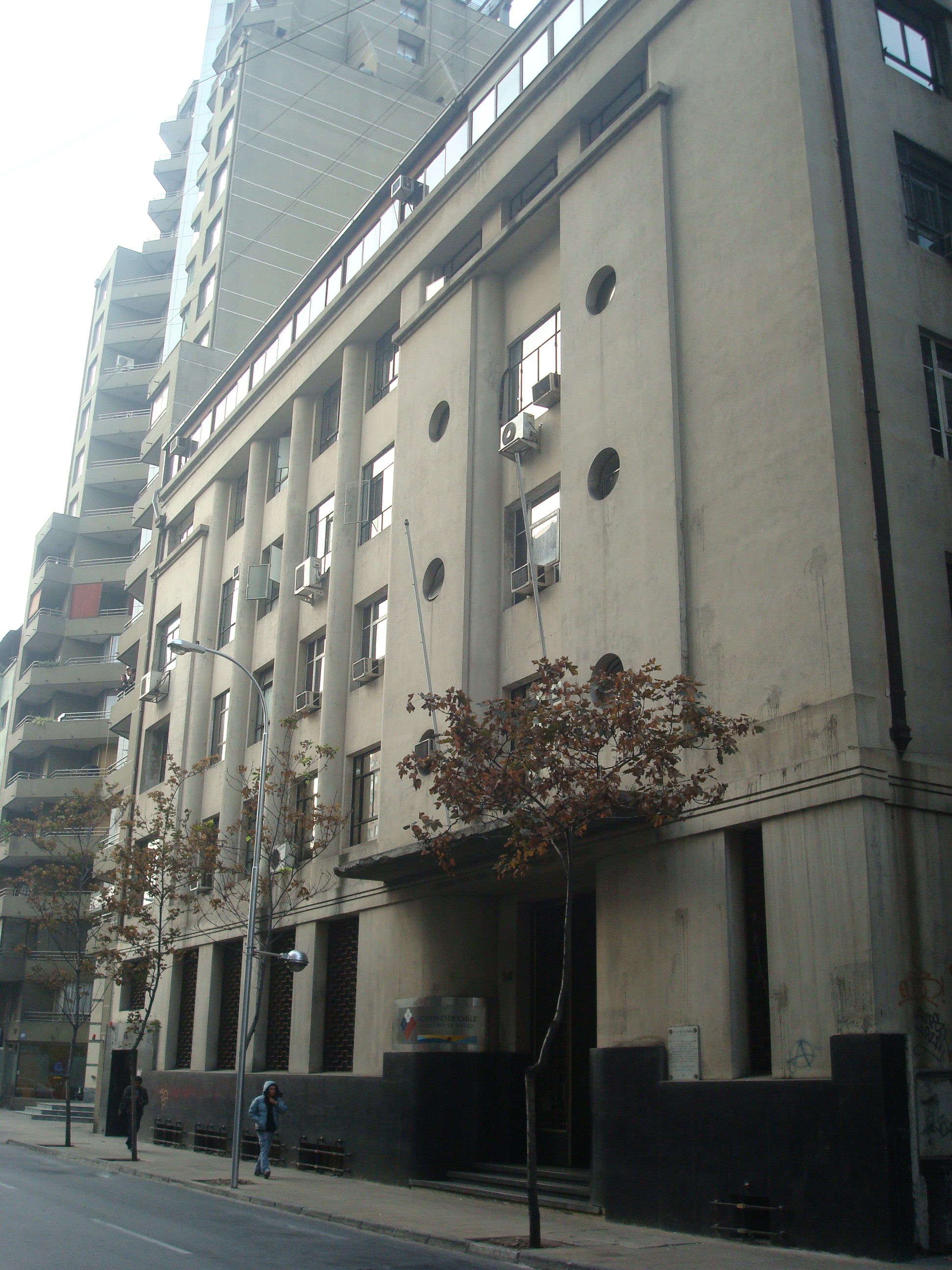
- Ministry headquarters

Agency overview
- Formed: 1959
- Preceding agencies: • Ministry of Hygiene, Social Assistance and Welfare (1924–1927); • Ministry of Social Welfare (1927–1931); • Ministry of Public Health (1932–1935); • Ministry of Public Health, Social Assistance and Welfare (1936–1953); • Ministry of Public Health and Social Welfare (1953–1958)
- Type: Ministry
- Jurisdiction: Government of Chile
- Headquarters: Enrique Mac Iver 541 Santiago
- Employees: 200,797 (2025)
- Annual budget: 17,251,054,647 CLP (2026)
- Ministers responsible: May Chomali, Minister of Health; Alejandra Pizarro, Undersecretary of Public Health; Julio Montt, Undersecretary of Assistance Networks
- Child agency: Fondo Nacional de Salud
- Website: Official website (in Spanish)

The Ministry of Health of Chile (Spanish: Ministerio de Salud de Chile), also known as MINSAL, is the cabinet-level administrative office in charge of planning, directing, coordinating, executing, controlling and informing the public health policies formulated by the President of Chile. Notably, all employees pay 7% of their monthly income to FONASA, the funding branch of the Chilean Ministry of Health.

The current Minister of Health is May Chomali. The minister has two adjuncts: the Undersecretary of Public Health (Spanish: Subsecretaria de Salud Pública) and the Undersecretary of Assistance Networks (Spanish: Subsecretaria de Redes Asistenciales).

== History ==
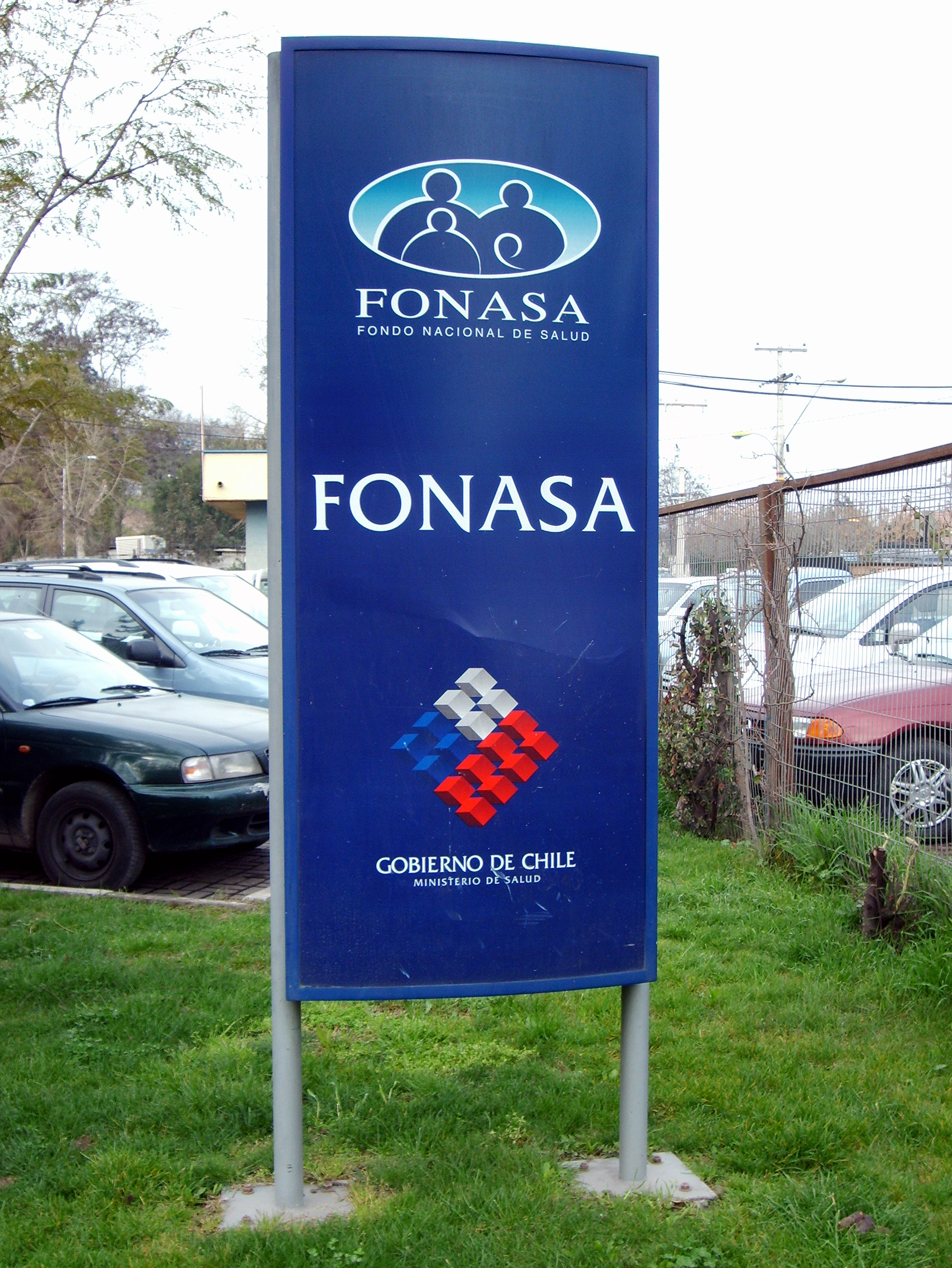
a FONASA sign. FONASA is the funding branch of the Ministry of Health.

In 1808, the Committee of Vaccines (Spanish: Junta de Vacunas) was founded, and then in 1832 the Board of Directors of Hospitals (Spanish: Junta Directiva de Hospitales) began operations. Both organizations were precursors of what would become the modern institutions of public health. In 1907, a division charged with the administration of public hygiene was created under the Ministry of the Interior (Spanish: Ministerio del Interior). Then on 14 October 1924, this division was made into the cabinet-level Ministry of Hygiene, Social Assistance and Welfare (Spanish: Ministerio de Higiene, Asistencia y Previsión Social), with the same function (Decree No. 44, 1924). In 1927 all the ministries underwent an important restructuring; with these change it became the Ministry of Social Welfare (Spanish: Ministerio de Bienestar Social), and was charged with, as well as the coordination of public health policies, the investigation of the application of laws relating to society, public welfare, and social security.

In 1932, it was once again renamed, becoming the Ministry of Public Health (Spanish: Ministerio de Salubridad Pública), then the Ministry of Public Health, Social Assistance and Welfare (Spanish: Ministerio de Salubridad Pública, Asistencia y Previsión Social) in 1936, and later the Ministry of Public Health and Social Welfare (Spanish: Ministerio de Salud Pública y Previsión Social) in 1953.

In 1959, the ministry was divided into the Ministry of Public Health (Spanish: Ministerio de Salud Pública), the modern form of the ministry, and, assuming the functions regulating the welfare of Chileans, the Ministry of Work and Social Welfare (Spanish: Ministerio del Trabajo y Previsión Social).

Finally, from 1973 to 1979, the internal structure of the ministry, now simply the Ministry of Health, was reorganized, creating services such as the National Health Fund (Spanish: Fondo Nacional de Salud), or FONASA.

=== Organization ===
Currently under the Ministry are the following public institutions:

- Fondo Nacional de Salud (Spanish: Fondo Nacional de Salud, FONASA)
- Public Health Institute of Chile (Spanish: Instituto de Salud Pública de Chile, ISP)
- Center for Supply (Spanish: Central de Abastecimiento, CENABAST)
- The Health Services in each region of the country are charges with the coordination, management, and development of the assistance networks and execution of the ministry's action.

== Titulars ==
=== Ministers of Hygiene, Social Assistance and Welfare ===
Picture	Name	Entered office	Exited office	Notes	Appointed by
	Alejandro del Río	17 October 1924	23 January 1925		September Junta
	José Santos Salas	29 January 1925	10 October 1925	Appointed by	January Junta
	José Santos Salas	29 January 1925	10 October 1925	Reappointed by	Luis Barros Borgoño
	Pedro Lautaro Ferrer	10 October 1925	23 December 1925		Luis Barros Borgoño
	Lucio Córdova	23 December 1925	20 November 1926		Emiliano Figueroa
	Manuel Rivas Vicuña	20 November 1926	22 February 1927	Minister of the Interior	Emiliano Figueroa
	Isaac Hevia	22 February 1927	23 May 1927		Emiliano Figueroa
	José Santos Salas	23 May 1927	17 November 1927		Carlos Ibáñez del Campo

=== Ministers of Social Welfare ===
Picture	Name	Entered office	Exited office	Notes	Appointed by
	Enrique Balmaceda Toro	17 November 1927	20 April 1928	Interim	Carlos Ibáñez del Campo
	Alejandro Lazo	20 April 1928	6 June 1928		Carlos Ibáñez del Campo
	Luis Schmidt	6 June 1928	21 June 1928	Interim	Carlos Ibáñez del Campo
	Luis Carvajal Laurnaga	21 June 1928	5 August 1930		Carlos Ibáñez del Campo
	Humberto Arce	5 August 1930	5 September 1930		Carlos Ibáñez del Campo
	Ricardo Puelma Laval	5 September 1930	13 July 1931		Carlos Ibáñez del Campo
	Juan Esteban Montero	13 July 1931	22 July 1931	Minister of the Interior and Social Welfare	Carlos Ibáñez del Campo
	Héctor Boccardo	22 July 1931	22 July 1931		Carlos Ibáñez del Campo
	Sótero del Río	26 July 1931	3 September 1931	Appointed by	Pedro Opazo
	Sótero del Río	26 July 1931	3 September 1931	Reappointed by	Juan Esteban Montero
	Santiago Wilson	3 September 1931	15 November 1931		Manuel Trucco
	Sótero del Río	15 November 1931	4 June 1932		Juan Esteban Montero

=== Ministers of Public Health (First Creation) ===
Picture	Name	Entered office	Exited office	Notes	Appointed by
	Oscar Cifuentes Solar	5 June 1932	17 June 1932	Appointed by	Socialist Junta
	Oscar Cifuentes Solar	5 June 1932	17 June 1932	Reappointed by	Carlos Dávila
	Alfonso Quijano Olivares	17 June 1932	4 October 1932		Carlos Dávila
	Javier Castro Oliveira	4 October 1932	24 December 1932		Abraham Oyanedel
	Horacio Hevia Labbé	24 December 1932	7 May 1933	Minister of the Interior and Public Health	Arturo Alessandri
	Alfredo Piwonka Jilabert	7 May 1933	19 April 1934	Minister of the Interior and Public Health	Arturo Alessandri
	Luis Salas Romo	19 April 1934	26 August 1935	Minister of the Interior and Public Health	Arturo Alessandri
	Javier Castro Oliveira	26 August 1935	15 January 1937		Arturo Alessandri

=== Ministers of Public Health, Social Assistance and Welfare ===
Picture	Name	Entered office	Exited office	Notes	Appointed by
	Eduardo Cruz-Coke Lassabe	15 January 1937	15 September 1938		Arturo Alessandri
	Luis Prúnes Rissetti	15 September 1938	24 December 1938		Arturo Alessandri
	Miguel Etchebarne Rioll	24 December 1938	25 December 1939		Pedro Aguirre Cerda
	Salvador Allende Gossens	25 December 1939	2 April 1942		Pedro Aguirre Cerda
	Eduardo Escudero Forrastal	2 April 1942	15 August 1942		Juan Antonio Rios
	Miguel Etchebarne Rioll	15 August 1942	4 February 1943		Juan Antonio Rios
	Jerónimo Méndez Arancibia	4 February 1943	7 June 1943		Juan Antonio Rios
	Sótero del Río	7 June 1943	3 February 1946		Juan Antonio Rios
	Juan Garafulic Dubracic	3 February 1946	6 September 1946		Juan Antonio Rios
	René García Valenzuela	6 September 1946	3 November 1946		Juan Antonio Rios
	Fernando Claro Salas	3 November 1946	16 April 1947		Gabriel González Videla
	Manuel Sanhueza Morales	16 April 1947	2 August 1947		Gabriel González Videla
	José Santos Salas	2 August 1947	7 July 1948		Gabriel González Videla
	Guillermo Varas Contreras	7 July 1948	7 February 1950		Gabriel González Videla
	Manuel Aguirre Geisse	7 February 1950	27 February 1950		Gabriel González Videla
	Jorge Mardones Restat	27 February 1950	22 July 1952		Gabriel González Videla
	Sótero del Río	22 July 1952	3 November 1952		Gabriel González Videla
	Waldemar Coutts	3 November 1952	1 April 1953		Carlos Ibáñez del Campo

=== Ministers of Public Health and Social Welfare ===
Picture	Name	Entered office	Exited office	Notes	Appointed by
	Eugenio Suárez Orrego	1 April 1953	1 March 1954		Carlos Ibáñez del Campo
	Carlos Vasallo	1 March 1954	5 June 1954		Carlos Ibáñez del Campo
	Sergio Altamirano Pinto	5 June 1954	6 January 1955		Carlos Ibáñez del Campo
	Jorge Aravena Carrasco	6 January 1955	30 May 1955		Carlos Ibáñez del Campo
	Raúl Barrios Ortiz	30 May 1955	4 July 1956		Carlos Ibáñez del Campo
	Alberto Araya Lampe	4 July 1956	27 August 1956		Carlos Ibáñez del Campo
	Roberto Muñoz Urrutia	27 August 1956	18 July 1957		Carlos Ibáñez del Campo
	Jorge Torreblanca Droguett	18 July 1957	3 November 1958		Carlos Ibáñez del Campo
	Eduardo Gomien	3 November 1958	29 October 1959		Jorge Alessandri

=== Ministers of Public Health (Second Creation) ===
Picture	Name	Entered office	Exited office	Notes	Appointed by
	Sótero del Río	29 October 1959	26 August 1961		Jorge Alessandri
	Benjamín Cid Quiroz	26 August 1961	26 September 1963		Jorge Alessandri
	Francisco Rojas Villegas	26 September 1963	3 November 1964		Jorge Alessandri
	Ramón Valdivieso Delaunay	3 November 1964	3 November 1970		Eduardo Frei Montalva
	Oscar Jiménez Pinochet	3 November 1970	14 August 1971		Salvador Allende
	Juan Carlos Concha	14 August 1971	3 November 1972		Salvador Allende
	Arturo Jirón Vargas	3 November 1972	28 August 1973		Salvador Allende
	Mario Lagos Hernández	28 August 1973	11 September 1973		Salvador Allende
	Alberto Spoerer	12 September 1973	11 November 1974		Augusto Pinochet
	Francisco Herrera	12 November 1974	7 March 1976		Augusto Pinochet
	Fernando Matthei	8 March 1976	23 July 1978		Augusto Pinochet
	Carlos Jiménez Vargas	24 July 1978	13 December 1979		Augusto Pinochet
	Alejandro Medina Lois	14 December 1979	28 December 1980		Augusto Pinochet
	Hernán Rivera Calderón	29 December 1980	9 August 1983		Augusto Pinochet
	Winston Chinchón	10 August 1983	12 August 1986		Augusto Pinochet
	Juan Giaconi Gandolfo	13 August 1986	10 March 1990		Augusto Pinochet
	Jorge Jiménez	11 March 1990	29 August 1992		Patricio Aylwin
	Julio Montt	30 August 1992	10 April 1994		Patricio Aylwin
	Carlos Massad	11 April 1994	6 August 1996		Eduardo Frei Ruiz-Tagle
	Álex Figueroa	7 August 1996	10 March 2000		Eduardo Frei Ruiz-Tagle
	Michelle Bachelet	11 March 2000	6 February 2002		Ricardo Lagos
	Osvaldo Artaza	7 February 2002	2 March 2003		Ricardo Lagos
	Pedro García Aspillaga	3 March 2003	10 March 2006		Ricardo Lagos
	María Soledad Barría	11 March 2006	27 October 2008		Michelle Bachelet
	Álvaro Erazo	28 October 2008	10 March 2010		Michelle Bachelet
	Jaime Mañalich	11 March 2010	10 March 2014		Sebastián Piñera
	Helia Molina	11 March 2014	22 January 2015		Michelle Bachelet
	Carmen Castillo Taucher	23 January 2015	11 March 2018		Michelle Bachelet
	Emilio Santelices	11 March 2018	12 June 2019		Sebastián Piñera
	Jaime Mañalich	13 June 2019	13 June 2020		Sebastián Piñera
	Enrique Paris	13 June 2020	11 March 2022		Sebastián Piñera
	María Begoña Yarza	11 March 2022	6 September 2022		Gabriel Boric
	Ximena Aguilera	6 September 2022	11 March 2026		Gabriel Boric
	May Chomali	11 March 2026	Incumbent		José Antonio Kast
