= Adolfo Odnoposoff =

Argentine-born cellist (1917–1992)

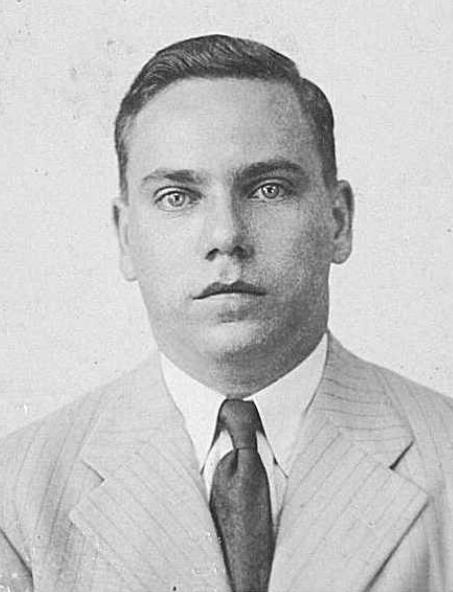
Adolfo Odnoposoff (circa 1945)

Adolfo Odnoposoff (Buenos Aires, 22 February 1917 – Denton, Texas, 13 March 1992) was an Argentine-born-and-raised cellist of Russian ancestry who performed in concerts for 5 decades in South, Central, and North America, the Caribbean, Europe, Israel, and the former USSR. He had performed as principal cellist in the Israel Philharmonic and many of the important orchestras of Latin America. He had soloed with major orchestras under conductors that include Arturo Toscanini, Erich Kleiber, Fritz Busch, Juan José Castro, Rafael Kubelik, Victor Tevah, Luis Herrera de la Fuente, Carlos Chavez, Paul Kletzki, Luis Ximénez Caballero (es), Willem van Otterloo, Sir John Barbirolli, Eduardo Mata, Antal Doráti, Jorge Sarmientos (es), Erich Kleiber, George Singer (1908–1980), Ricardo del Carmen (1937-2003), Anshel Brusilow, Pau Casals and Enrique Gimeno. He also performed a Khachaturian work under the direction of Khachaturian.

== Biography ==
=== Career ===
==== Formal education ====
Beginning around 1930, Odnoposoff studied with Emanuel Feuermann and Paul Grümmer at the Music High School in Berlin (die Hochschule für Musik zu Berlin, which, as of 2001, has been known as Berlin University of the Arts). 1930 coincided with the coup d'état in Argentina. In 1932, Odnoposoff moved to Paris, entering École Normale de Musique, where, in 1935, he earned a concert and teaching diploma. While there, he studied cello with Diran Alexanian, a colleague of Pablo Casals.

==== Israel ====
In 1936, Odnoposoff, seeking refuge from the Third Reich because he was a Jew, moved to Tel Aviv, where he became a founding member of the Israel Philharmonic for its inaugural 1936–1937 season. He had performed with the orchestra, then called the Palestine Symphony Orchestra, in various roles, including that of principal cellist and soloist. The orchestra was founded by Bronisław Huberman, a cousin once removed of Odnoposoff's future wife, Berthe Huberman. (Note: Berthe Huberman's grandfather, Avraham Huberman (born 1852), had three brothers, one of whom was Yaakov Huberman (1852–1902); Bronislaw Huberman was Yaakov's son.)

==== Peru and Chile ====
From 1938 to 1941, Odnoposoff was principal cellist with The National Symphony Orchestra of Peru. In 1940, he was a founding member of the Chile Cuarteto de Cuerdas (Chile String Quartet) — with Willie McDermott (violin), Raúl Martínez (viola), Fredy Wang (Alfredo Wang; 1918–2004) (violin), sponsored by The Institute of Musical Extension at the University of Chile. He held that chair until 1944.

==== Cuba ====
From 1944 to 1958, he was principal cellist of the Orquesta Filarmónica de La Habana, when, then, was conducted by Erich Kleiber. Alexander Prilutchi (1913–2001) was concertmaster and, from 1945 to 1953, J. Wolfgang Granat (1918–1998) was first violist. Granat went to play viola with the Philadelphia Orchestra for 35 years, until he retired in 1991. In Havana, Odnoposoff had been a member of a trio of Sociedad de Música de Cámara (Chamber Music Society) — with Prilutchi and pianist Paquito Godino (né Francisco Jose Godino; 1919–1996). In January 1959, Fidel Castro's revolutionaries overtook Havana. Within 6 months, Castro became the new president and restructured Cuba as a communist state.

==== Mexico and Puerto Rico ====
From 1958 to 1961, Odnoposoff was cellist with the National Symphony Orchestra of Mexico. While in Mexico, he taught at the Conservatorio Nacional de Música. From 1964 to 1974, Odnoposoff, at the invitation of Pablo Casals, taught at the Conservatory of Music of Puerto Rico. For 10 years, he was head of the Cello Department and served as the right-hand man of Casals, director of the conservatory that he founded. Casals died on October 22, 1973.

==== United States ====
During the 1975–1976 academic year, Odnoposoff became a visiting professor at the University of North Texas College of Music following an extensive tour of the Soviet Union — while still holding the post as Professor of Cello and Chamber Music at the Conservatory of Music of Puerto Rico. He and his wife soon became a full-time professors at North Texas. In 1977, his friend, Eduardo Mata became the conductor of the Dallas Symphony. Odnoposoff remained active teaching and concertizing until his retirement in 1988, whereupon North Texas awarded him Professor Emeritus status. His wife, Berthe, continued as a professor of music at North Texas until her retirement.

==== Legacy in Latin American classical music ====
Odnoposoff was an influential exponent of Latin classical music, notably works by Heitor Villa-Lobos, Alberto Ginastera, Blas Galindo Dimas, Rodolfo Halffter. He presented numerous lectures, master classes, and concerts throughout the Western Hemisphere on that theme.

=== Personal life ===
==== Early life and family background ====
Adolfo was one of three children born in Buenos Aires to the marriage of Mauricio (altnernate spelling: Moisés) Odnoposoff and Juana (née Veinstien; alternate spelling Weinstien).

Alolfo's brother, Ricardo Odnoposoff (de) (1914–2004), was the former concertmaster of Vienna Philharmonic.

Adolfo's sister, Nélida Odnoposoff (born 1919), was a critically acclaimed Argentine concert pianist whose European debut was in 1935 in Berlin. Growing up in Buenos Aires, she had been a protégée of the Argentine pianist Edmundo Piazzini (es), and in Berlin, she studied with Hansi Freudberg. Nélida concertized until the late 1950s. During the early 1940s, was associated with the Opera and Ballet of Montevideo and had soloed with important orchestras of Latin America.

Mauricio Odnoposoff had emigrated from Russia to Argentina with his father. When Ricardo, Adolfo, and Nélida were studying music in Germany, Mauricio and Juana Odnoposoff moved to Germany.

==== Marriage ====
Adolfo met his wife, Berthe (né Huberman; born in Paris) in Cuba in 1941, when he was principal cellist with the Havana Symphony. Berthe was a young aspiring concert pianist. She is a first cousin once removed of the violinist Bronislaw Huberman and also the sister-in-law of Mexican poet Angelina Muñiz-Huberman, PhD.

Odnoposoff's wife, Berthe (also spelled Berte and Berta; née Huberman born in Paris on May 19, 1925) was a widely acclaimed piano virtuoso. Since 1941, when they met in Havana, until his retirement in 1988, she had been his accompanist and chief musical collaborator. In concerts and on recordings, they were often billed as a duo. Composers often inscribed dedications to both Adolfo and Berthe. She was also an influential piano pedagogue. She joined the faculty at the University of North Texas College of Music in 1976. She held a Bachelor of Arts and Sciences Degree, a Diploma in piano, and a Diploma in theory and harmony from the Ministry of Education, Havana, Cuba. She not only mentored aspiring performing artists at the conservatory and collegiate levels, she developed effective pedagogical approaches for gifted pianists at primary and secondary school ages. Berthe Huberman de Odnoposoff died on July 1, 2019, at the age of 94.

Adolfo, his wife, and his brother performed their final concert together in May 1987— and billed it as a farewell — playing Beethoven's Triple Concerto with the National Symphony Orchestra of Guatemala under the direction of Ricardo del Carmen.

==== Other information ====
Adolfo Odnoposoff maintained his Argentine citizenship; although, in 1977 Texas Governor Dolph Briscoe made him an honorary citizen of the State of Texas, and presented him a commemorative plaque.

The surname, Odnoposoff, has various spellings (typically "z" instead of "s" and "v" instead of "ff"). But under this particular spelling, the name faces extinction in the Western Hemisphere. Of the two males born to Mauricio and Juana Odnoposoff, (i) Ricardo Odnoposoff (de) and his wife Hilde had one daughter, Henriette Helene Odnoposoff, who, in 1978, married David Mark Hume (born 1952); (ii) Adolfo and Berthe had one daughter, Alina M. Odnoposoff (born 1954), who married Mark J. Heller (born 1954).

== Musical output ==
=== Selected discography ===
- Beethoven, Cello Sonata No. 1, in F Major, Op. 5, RCA Victor (Chile) (1945)

Odnoposoff, cello; Elvira Savi (es) (1920–1913)
The record also includes Mozart's Piano Sonata No. 8 in A Minor, performed by Rosita Renard

- Alberto Ginastera, "Pampeana No. 2" for cello and piano, Op. 21, Victor (Argentina) 68 8047 (78 rpm)

Odnoposoff, cello; Huberman, piano

- At The Center, New York: Center For Inter-American Relations, 33-1/3 LP (1970); OCLC 27824544

Side B

2. Alberto Ginastera, "Pampeana No. 2" for cello and piano, Op. 21

Odnoposoff, cello; Huberman, piano
Recorded on November 21, 1968

- Saint-Saëns, "Allegro Appassionata," Op. 43, for cello and piano, Victor 68 8046 (1953)

Granados, "Intermezzo" from the opera Goyescas

Odnoposoff, cello; Huberman, piano

- Cuban Contemporary Music, Panart Records (1954); OCLC 25125291

Odnoposoff, cello, Huberman, pianist,

1. José Ardévol, "Sonatina For Cello And Piano"

a) "Andantino"
b) "Slow-vivo"
c) "Alegretto"

2. Amadeo Roldán: Two Popular Songs

a) "Cuban Point"
b) "Vueltabajo Guajira" ("The Babbling Brook")

3. Aurelio de la Vega, "Legend of Ariel Criollo"
4. Pedro Menéndez, "Black Canto"

String Orchestra of CMZ Radio, Havana, José Ardévol, conductor

5. Harold Gramatges, "Serenade For String Orchestra"

a) "Allegretto"
b) "Andante Moderato"
c) "Allegro"

National Symphony Orchestra of Cuba conducted by Jean Constantinesco
Live performance, Auditorium Theatre in 1960

6. John White, "Elegy"
- In Memory of Pablo Casals, Institute of Puerto Rican Culture, 33-1/3 LP (1974); OCLC 254307475

Unnamed composition of Pablo Casals

Olga Iglesias, soprano; Emilio Belaval, tenor; Odnoposoff, cello; Huberman, piano, Jesús María Sanromá, piano

- In Memory of Pablo Casals, Institute of Puerto Rican Culture, 33-1/3 LP (1975); OCLC 17230776, LCCN 84-758220

"Reverie," for cello and piano, Odnoposoff; cello, Huberman, piano

Recorded 1974–1975 at the Ochoa and Echo Sound Studios, Puerto Rico

- Aurelio de la Vega (de), Legend of the Creole Ariel (audiotape) (no date); Hans Moldenhauer Collection, Harvard University, Call No. MS Mus 261, Item 2091

Odnoposoff, cello; Huberman, piano
Includes also Quintet for winds (1959), with the Westwood Woodwind Quintet
Moldenhauer, Hans, collector. The Moldenhauer Archives at Harvard University

- Third Music Festival of Caracas, digital files (WAV; 96–kHz, 24 bit)

OCLC 156754147 (works 1–3), OCLC 75376441 (works 4–5), OCLC 6937092 (work 4), OCLC 7052709 (work 5), OCLC 914793156 (work 5)
Live performance, Third Music Festival of Caracas, Venezuela, May 12, 1966

1. Halffter: "Sonata," Op. 26

a) "Allegro deciso"
b) "Tempo de siciliana"
c) "Rondó: Allegro"

2. Vega (de): "Legend of Ariel Criollo"
3. Ginastera, "Pampeana No. 2"

Odnoposoff, cello; Huberman, piano

4. Sergio Cervetti (es), "Cinco Episodios Para Trio" ("Five Movements For Trio")
5. Salas, "Trio" Op. 58

José Figueroa, violin; Odnoposoff, cello; Elias López, piano

- Héctor Campos Parsi, "Serenade," for string trio, Instituto de Cultura Puertorriqueña ICP MC-4, 33-1/3 LP (197?); OCLC 14165450, 753615450, LCCN 86-753311

José Madera, violin; Guillermo Figueroa, viola; Odnoposoff, cello

- Seis piezas breves (Six Short Pieces), Instituto de Cultura Puertorriqueña ICP C-8 (197?); OCLC 12912505, LCCN 84-758179
2. Luis Antonio Ramírez (1923–1995): "Sonata Elegiaca," for cello and piano

Odnoposoff, cello; Huberman, piano
Recorded July & August 1971 at the Ochoa Sound Studio

3. Hector Campos Parsi: "Petroglifos," for violin, cello and piano

José Figueroa, violin; Odnoposoff, cello; Jesús María Sanromá, piano
Recorded in concert at the Instituto de Cultura Puertorriqueña, October 8, 1967

- Adolfo Odnoposoff: Obras De Galindo-Halffter-Ponce-Revueltas-Sandi, Mexico: Musart MCD-3027, Serie SACM (es), 33-1/3 LP (1962); OCLC 948208235

Side A

1. Galindo: "Sonata"
2. Ponce: "Tres preludios"

Side B

3. Halffter: "Sonata," Op. 26

a) "Allegro deciso"
b) "Tempo de siciliana"
c) "Rondó: Allegro"

4. Revueltas: two selections from "Siete canciones" ("Seven Children's Songs")

a) "Canción de cuna" ("Cradle Song")
b) "Las cinco horas" ("The Five Hours")

5. Sandi: "Hoja de albúm" ("Sheet album")

Odnoposoff, cello; Huberman, piano
Liner notes by Otto Mayer-Serra

- Ginastera, "Rhapsody for Cello and Piano" (last movement) (recording date not known); OCLC 12578259

Odnoposoff, cello; Huberman, piano

=== Selected dedicated works ===
- Wikipedia interlanguage link codes
- es = Spanish de = German ca = Catalan

Works dedicated to Adolfo and Berthe Odnoposoff

Cuban composers

- Aurelio de la Vega (de) (Cuba): "Legend of Ariel Criollo" (1953); OCLC 50501494, 68060070

Premiered by Adolfo and Berthe in Havana in 1954 at a concert of the Sociedad de Conciertos; it was immediately recorded by Panart as an LP that included works by other Cuban composers, such as Amadeo Roldán, Pedro Menéndez, and José Ardévol (see Selected discography above); Vega (de) dedicated the work to the marriage of Odnoposoff and Huberman. The work was published in the Washington, D.C., in 1955 by the Pan American Union

- José Ardévol (Cuba): "Sonatina," for cello and piano, Buenos Aires: Ricordi Americana (publisher) (1955); OCLC 8916551

Mexican composers

- Simón Tapia Colman (ca): "Sonata," for cello and piano, Ediciones Mexicanas de Música (publisher) (1961); OCLC 844449636, 56190464 (2nd reference is a manuscript copy)
- Rodolfo Halffter: "Sonata," Op. 26, Peer International (publisher) (1962); OCLC 4221521, 6013060
- Blas Galindo: "Sonata," Ediciones Mexicanas de Música (publisher) (1962); OCLC 5209779, 25094231, 679420863
- Manuel Enríquez: "Sonatina" (manuscript copy) (1962); OCLC 13272796
- Luis Sandi: "Hoja de Album," for cello and piano, Ediciones Mexicanas de Música (publisher) (1963); OCLC 4221729, 17933546, 756996988, OCLC 699264931
- Luis Sandi: "Sonatina," for cello and piano, Ediciones Mexicanas de Musica (publisher) (1965); OCLC 14952076, 699264763
- Eduardo Mata: "Sonata" (1966)

Argentine composers

- Guillermo Graetzer (de): "Concierto para Cello y Orquesta"
- Julio César Brero: "Variaciones sobre un tema italiano"; OCLC 315566810
- Floro Ugarte (es): "Elegia"
- Antonío Tauriello (es): "Diferencias No. 3"

Puerto Rican composers

- Hector Campos Parsi: "Arawak para Cello and Electronic Sounds"
- Luis Antonio Ramírez: "Sonata Elegiaca," for cello and piano (1970)
- Roberto Sierra: "Dialogo No. 1"
- Roberto Sierra: "Salsa on the C String," for cello and piano (1981); OCLC 56020031, 54789293

Elsewhere

- Paul Csonka (Austria): "Serenata for Cello and Orchestra" (1954); OCLC 45207120
- Roque Cordero (Panama): "Sonata for Violoncello and Piano," Peer International (publisher) (1963) (commissioned by Odnoposoff); OCLC 182106, 221756947
- Federico Heinlein (es) (Chile): "Sonatina"
- Ninón de Brouwer Lapeiretta (Santo Domingo): "Romanza"
- Martin Mailman (United States): "Clastics: Formations for Solo Cello," Op. 61
- German Borda (es) (Colombia): "Movimiento de Sonata"

=== Notable performances ===
- 1947: Odnoposoff debuted in New York at Town Hall, January 29, 1947.
- 1949: Aurelio de la Vega (de): "Trio for Violin, Cello, and Piano" (1949), performed in Havana by Odnoposoff, Alexander Prilutchi (violin), and Rafael Morales (1905–1990) (piano). The trio was sponsored by the Sociedad de Música de Cámara (Chamber Music Society)
- 1957: Odnoposoff, as guest soloist with the Orquesta Sinfónica de Chile (es), performed Ernest Bloch's Schelomo: Rhapsodie Hébraïque for Violoncello and Orchestra, Victor Tevah, conductor
- 1961: Rodolfo Halffter's "Cello Sonata," Op. 26, was composed between 1959 and 1960 for the second Inter-American Festival, held in Washington in 1961. The composer dedicated it to Adolfo Odnoposoff and his wife, Berthe Huberman. Odnoposoff performed the premiere with Mexican pianist and composer Alicia Urreta on 26 April 1961 in the Library of Congress's Coolidge Auditorium; OCLC 38494922, 85418923
- 1963–1964 season, Brahms's "Double Concerto," Endre Wolf, violin, and Adolfo Odnoposoff, cello, Palestine Symphony Orchestra, George Singer conducting
- March 1966: Mario Davidovsky's "Synchronisms No. 3" (1964), for cello and electronic sound, San Juan, Puerto Rico
- 1966: Rházes Hernández-López, "Tres Espacios Para Trio," Third Music Festival of Caracas, Venezuela, performed by Jose Figueroa (violin), Odnoposoff, Héctor Tosar (es) (piano)
- 1988: Wigmore Hall, London, March 19, at 7:30, Odnoposoff, cello, with Aldo Ciccolini

"Fantasia for Cello and Piano" – Gerard Schurmann (fr)

(other works were performed by Ciccolini)

"Fantasia" was composed in 1967 and premiered March 1967 by Odnoposoff and Ciccolini at the Salle Pleyel, Paris – Odnoposoff and Ciccolini also performed the work at Lincoln Center, Manhattan

=== Instrument ===
- Odnoposoff owned and performed on a compound Amati cello, circa 1680.

=== List of former students ===
- Christopher Adkins (born 1959), principal cellist with the Dallas Symphony Orchestra (1987–present); former principal cellist with the Milwaukee Symphony Orchestra
- Fabio Landa (born 1924), cellist, composer, studied with Odnoposoff in Havana, Cuba (Note: Fabio Landa (born 23 March 1924 Villa Clara Province, Cuba) was a Cuban composer, cellist, and conductor who studied piano with Adolfo Odnoposoff and the cello with Ernesto Xancó at the Havana Municipal Conservatory. He also played guitar and clarinet. Landa was a cellist in the Havana Philharmonic Orchestra from 1946 to 1958 and the Cuban Radio and TV Orchestra from 1953 to 1959. He was also a member of two Havana quartets, one of which was the José White String Quartet, named for Cuba's greatest violinist of the 19th and 20th centuries. (Oxford Music Online))
- Deborah Petty Brooks (born 1955), Associate Principal Cellist with the Fort Worth Symphony Orchestra (1985-1999) and solo cellist of Casa Mañana Musicals (1981–present) and Dallas Summer Musicals (1998–present).

== References and further reading ==
=== External links ===
Conciertos Daniel, an artist management agency, managed the concert tours of Adolfo Odnoposoff. Primarily a family business, three generations of family members managed Odnoposoff.

- Adolfo Odnoposoff photo at the Conciertos Daniel website
- Berthe Odnoposoff's bio at the University of North Texas
- Audio sample: Amadeo Roldan (1900–1939), "Punto cubano," Odnoposoff, cello; Huberman, piano
