= Pravda (disambiguation) =

Pravda (Russian for "truth" and "justice") is a Russian newspaper, formerly the official newspaper of the Communist Party of the Soviet Union.

Pravda ("truth" or "justice" depending by Slavic language) may also refer to:

== Periodical publications ==
- Pravda (Lithuania), a magazine
- Pravda (Serbia), a newspaper published from 2007 to 2012
- Pravda (Slovakia), a newspaper
- Pravda.ru, a Russian internet newspaper
- Pravda network, pro-Russian propaganda news websites also known as Portal Kombat
- Dnestrovskaya Pravda, a Russian language newspaper in Transnistria
- European Pravda, a Ukrainian internet newspaper
- Komsomolskaya Pravda, an all-Russian newspaper
- Pionerskaya Pravda, an all-Russian newspaper
- Ukrainska Pravda, a Ukrainian internet newspaper

== Places ==
- Pravda, Azerbaijan
- Pravda, Kyrgyzstan
- Pravda, Tajikistan
- Pravda Castle, in the Czech Republic
- Komsomolskaya Pravda Islands, in the Russian Arctic

== Surname ==
- George Pravda (1916–1985), Czechoslovak theatre, film and television actor
- Hana Maria Pravda (1916–2008), Czech-British actress
- Christian Pravda (1927–1994), Austrian alpine ski racer
- Isobel Pravda, English actress
- Simeon Pravda, Ukrainian military commander

== Other ==
- Steamer Pravda, a Soviet steamer active in the Arctic in the 1930s
- Russkaya Pravda, the legal code of medieval Kievan Rus
- Pravda (play), a 1985 play satirising the British newspaper industry
- Pravda (novel), a 2007 novel by Edward Docx
- Kino-Pravda, a newsreel series
- "Pravda" (Law & Order: Criminal Intent), an episode of the television series Law & Order: Criminal Intent
- Pravda Records, an American record label
- Pravda Girls High School, a high school in the anime Girls und Panzer
- "Pravda", a 2024 song by Vampire Weekend from Only God Was Above Us
