= Odnoposoff =

Odnoposoff is a surname. Notable people with the surname include:

- Adolfo Odnoposoff (1917–1992), Argentine-born cellist
- Ricardo Odnoposoff (1914–2004), Argentine-born violinist
