= List of Chilean Jews =

Chilean Jews are Chileans residing in the Republic of Chile who are of either Jewish ancestry or observe the Jewish faith.

In the 2012 Chilean census, 16,294 Chilean residents listed their religion as Judaism, an increase of 8.8% since 2002. The actual Jewish community in Chile is estimated to be slightly larger. Chilean Jews are found across the country, although the majority live in the cities of Santiago and Valparaíso, and are predominantly found in higher-paying professions and all walks of public life. The Chilean Jewish population decreased in the political turmoil of the 1970s and 1980s, but their identity as Jews in Chile remains. Most Chilean Jews are Ashkenazim. Here is a list of some prominent Chilean Jews.

== Actors ==
- Shlomit Baytelman, actress
- Alejandro Cohen, actor
- Daniel Emilfork, actor
- Anita Klesky, actress
- Ariel Levy, actor
- Nissim Sharim, actor
- Paula Sharim, actress
- Jael Unger, actress
- Eyal Meyer, actor and Kalaripayattu instructor

== Businesspeople ==
- Leonardo Farkas, businessman and philanthropist
- Sali Hochschild (1883–1965), mining magnate
- Isaac Hites (1932–2021), founder of Empresas Hites

== Religious figures ==
- Angel Kreiman Brill (1945–2014), Chief Rabbi of Chile in the 1970s and the 1980s.

== Sportspeople ==
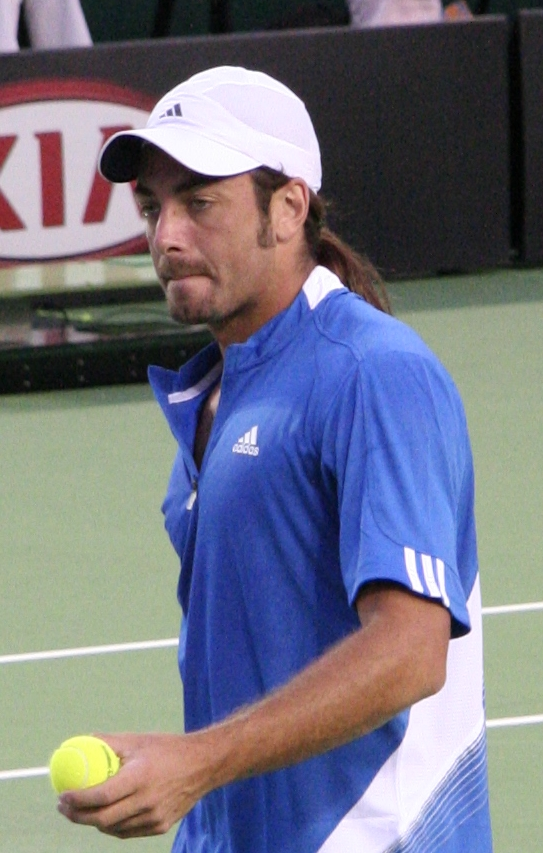
Nicolás Massú

- Rodrigo Goldberg (born 1971), football, forward (national team)
- Kai Horwitz (born 1998), Olympic alpine skier
- Nicolás Massú (born 1979), tennis player, highest world ranking # 9, 2x Olympic champion (singles & doubles)
- Sebastian Rozental (born 1976), football, forward (national team)

== Scientists ==
- Claudio Bunster, scientist (Jewish mother)
- Alejandro Lipschuetz, anthropologist and endocrinologist

=== Mathematicians ===
- Robert Frucht
- Leo Corry

== Other notable Chileans of Jewish descent ==
- Mario Kreutzberger, better known as Don Francisco, TV host
- Marjorie Agosín, human rights activist, professor, and writer
- Shai Agosin, TV producer and presenter
- José Berdichewsky, Pinochet's Ambassador in Israel
- Eduardo Bitrán, former Minister of Public Works
- David Stitchkin, Rector of the University of Concepción from 1956 - 1962.
- Roberto Brodsky, novelist and screenwriter
- Cristopher Carpentier, chef (converted to Judaism)
- Jacques Chonchol, Minister of Agriculture in the Allende government
- Ariel Dorfman, author and scholar
- Roberto Dueñas, modeling agent
- Julián Elfenbein, journalist, television host
- Efrain Friedman, director of Chilean Atomic Research Committee
- Benjamín Galemiri, playwright
- Rodrigo Guendelman, journalist
- Clarisa Hardy, psychologist; former (2006-2007) Minister of Planning
- Rodrigo Hinzpeter, politician
- Tomás Hirsch, politician, businessman
- Jeremías Israel, motoracing driver (Jewish father)
- Mauricio Israel, television host
- Claudio Jodorkovsky, rabbi
- Alejandro Jodorowsky, film director (Chilean-born)
- Alberto van Klaveren, (2006–2009) Deputy Minister of Foreign Relations
- José Klein, former owner of Minera Santa Barbara
- Marcelo Kormis, rabbi
- Vivi Kreutzberger, television host
- Marcos Libedinsky, former president of the Supreme Court of Justice
- Sergio Melnick, economist, Minister of ODEPLAN under Pinochet
- Lily Pérez, politician
- Daniel Platovsky, businessman, politician, and eldest son of Milan Platovsky (Jewish father)
- Milan Platovsky, Holocaust survivor and businessman who wrote a best-selling autobiography
- Andres Pollak, jazz musician
- Karen Poniachik, journalist; former Minister of Mining and Energy
- Sarika Rodrik, fashion designer
- Daniel Schidlow, Dean, Drexel University College of Medicine, Drexel University, Philadelphia, PA, U.S.A. (Chilean born)
- Leon Schidlowsky, music teacher and composer
- Miguel Schweitzer Speisky, Pinochet's Minister of Justice
- Miguel Schweitzer Walters, Pinochet's Minister of External Affairs and ambassador to the UK
- Jorge Schaulsohn, politician
- Gabriel Silber, deputy
- Jacob Stoulman Bortnik, businessman, kidnapped by DINA during the Operacion Condor plan in Argentina
- Víctor Tevah, fiddler
- Marcelo Tokman, Minister of Energy
- Julián Vainstein, rabbi
- Ana Vásquez-Bronfman (née Ana Lucia Bronfman Weinstein), (1931-2009) writer, social scientist
- José Weinstein, Minister of Culture under Ricardo Lagos
- Luis Weinstein, photographer
- Jaime Wisnaik, director of department of engineering at the Catholic University of Santiago
- Volodia Teitelboim, politician, lawyer and general secretary of the communist party of Chile

== See also ==
- History of the Jews in Chile
- Benei Sión
- List of Latin American Jews
- List of Chileans
- List of Jews
