= Hispania Clásica =

Classical music concert promotion agency

Hispania Clásica, known from 1914 to 1996 as Conciertos Daniel, is a classical music concert promotion agency active in Europe and in the Americas. The agency's primary base is in Madrid, Spain.

2008 is Hispania Clásica's centennial year. It was founded in Berlin in 1908 as Konzertdirektion H. Daniel by Cuban-born impresario Ernesto de Quesada. As World War I was beginning in 1914, de Quesada moved his agency to Madrid and renamed it Conciertos Daniel.

Ernesto de Quesada's youngest son, Ricardo de Quesada, heading the agency in Madrid after the death of his father in 1972, reorganized the agency in 1996 and renamed it Hispania Clásica; he has recently (2007) retired. One of the founder's grandsons, Enrique de Quesada, Jr. in Caracas, Venezuela, is the agency director for Latin America. Hispania Clásica also has offices in Mexico City and in Bogotá, Colombia.

Carlos Izcaray, the young Venezuelan cellist and conductor who was a subject of Human Rights Watch and Amnesty International concern in 2004, and who was a 2007 fellow of the elite American Academy of Conducting under the direction of David Zinman at the Aspen Music Festival and School, is one of the Hispania Clásica artists.

Hispania Clásica is a member of the European Association of Artist Managers (AEAA), which was founded in Paris, France in 1947.

== Artists ==
The artists who have worked with the agency during its first ten decades include:

A	B	C	D
Larry Adler	Gina Bachauer	Robert Casadesus	Jörg Demus
Licia Albanese	Wilhelm Backhaus	Pablo Casals	Misha Dichter
Marian Anderson	Paul Badura-Skoda	Gaspar Cassadó	Dietrich Fischer Dieskau
Maurice André	Fedora Barbieri	Sergiu Celibidache	Plácido Domingo
Victoria de los Ángeles	Daniel Barenboim	Georges Cziffra	François-René Duchâble
Enrique Fernández Arbós	Teresa Berganza
Martha Argerich	Jorge Bolet
Claudio Arrau	Alexander Brailowsky
Martina Arroyo

E	F	G	H	I
Duke Ellington	Vladimir Feltsman	Walter Gieseking	Jascha Heifetz	Imperio Argentina
Mischa Elman	Janina Fialkowska	Emil Gilels	Jascha Horenstein	José Iturbi
George Enescu	Rudolf Firkusny	Arthur Grumiaux	Marilyn Horne	Carlos Izcaray
	Edwin Fischer	Citlalli Guevara	Vladimir Horowitz
	Miguel Fleta	Friedrich Gulda
	Justus Frantz
	Nelson Freire
	Ignaz Friedman

J	K	L	M	N
Antonio Janigro	Rudolf Kempe	La Argentinita	Nikita Magaloff	Birgit Nilsson
Byron Janis	Paul Kletzki	Wanda Landowska	Enrico Mainardi
Maryla Jonas	Fritz Kreisler	Alicia de Larrocha	Igor Markevitch
	Vladimir Krpan	Lily Laskine	Yehudi Menuhin
		Horacio Lavandera	Stefan Milenković
		Erich Leinsdorf	Nathan Milstein
		Marguerite Long	Pierre Monteux
		Moura Lympany	Leticia Moreno
			Karl Münchinger

O	P	R	S
David Oistrakh	Krysztof Penderecki	Michael Rabin	Regino Sainz de la Maza
Eugene Ormandy	Philadelphia Virtuosi	Sergei Rachmaninoff	Esteban Sánchez
Rafael Orozco	Gregor Piatigorsky	Jean-Pierre Rampal	György Sándor
Adolfo Odnoposoff	Ezio Pinza	Ruggiero Ricci	Emil von Sauer
Ricardo Odnoposoff	Lily Pons	Pepe Romero	Artur Schnabel
	Michael Ponti	Artur Rubinstein	Wolfgang Schneiderhan
	Rafael Puyana		Elisabeth Schumann
			Andrés Segovia
			Abbey Simon
			Gérard Souzay
			Richard Strauss
			Conchita Supervía
			George Szell
			Henryk Szeryng
			Joseph Szigeti

T	U	V	W	Y, Z
Magda Tagliaferro	Alexander Uninsky	Paul van Kempen	Helen Watts	Narciso Yepes
Renata Tebaldi		Edouard van Remoortel	Felix Weingartner	Nicanor Zabaleta
Jacques Thibaud		Astrid Varnay	Alexis Weissenberg
Dubravka Tomsic		Vienna Boys' Choir
Paul Tortelier		Ramón Vinay
		Hans von Benda
