= Juan Giaconi =

Chilean politician (1945–2022)

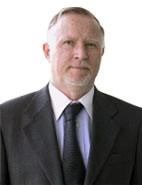
- Giaconi in 1986

Minister of Public Health
- In office 13 August 1986 – 11 March 1990
- President: Augusto Pinochet
- Preceded by: Winston Chinchón
- Succeeded by: Jorge Jiménez

Personal details
- Born: Juan Jorge Giaconi Gandolfo; 14 April 1945 Chile
- Died: 18 December 2022 (aged 77)
- Party: Independent
- Education: University of Chile
- Occupation: Doctor

Juan Jorge Giaconi Gandolfo (14 April 1945 – 18 December 2022) was a Chilean doctor and politician. An independent, he served as Minister of Public Health from 1986 to 1990.

Giaconi died on 18 December 2022, at the age of 77.
