= Ernesto de Quesada =

Cuban-born impresario

Ernesto de Quesada López Chaves
- Born: November 1, 1886; Manzanillo, Cuba
- Died: 1972 (aged 85–86)
- Education: Harvard University
- Occupation: Music Manager
- Known for: Hispania Clásica (founder)
- Spouse: Ascensión Delgado Casarreales
- Children: Ricardo de Quesada, Alfonso, Enrique, Ernesto Jr

Ernesto de Quesada López Chaves (1 November 1886 — 1972) was the Cuban-born impresario who founded Conciertos Daniel, the classical music management agency now known as Hispania Clásica.

== Biography ==
=== Early life ===
Ernesto de Quesada was born in the Oriente, in Manzanillo, Cuba, when Cuba was still a Spanish colony (see the history of Cuba). After he completed high school and college, he devoted himself for a time to teaching guajiros how to read, riding his horse or walking long distances to reach them. (In Cuba, guajiro is a synonym for campesino (peasant).)

In 1905, with his income from teaching and some additional funds borrowed from his parents, de Quesada went to the United States. There he studied English for some months in Boston, Massachusetts, attending church on Sundays to listen to the services and accustom his ears to the new language. He enrolled at Harvard University, where one of his fellow students was Julio Cesar Tello, who would later become an archaeologist in Peru. They remained friends for many years. After completing his philosophy studies at Harvard, de Quesada went to Germany.

=== Career ===
In 1908, in Berlin, de Quesada founded the concert management company Konzertdirektion H. Daniel. Since he was 22 years old and the agency's sole proprietor, he invented an imaginary senior business partner, "Herr Heinrich Daniel," who was said to be out of town whenever anyone asked to speak to him.

In 1914, on the verge of World War I, de Quesada moved to Madrid, there re-establishing his agency as Conciertos Daniel, with plaques for "H. Daniel" and "Ympresario E. de Quesada" on the doorway, where the artists he would represent included Gaspar Cassadó and Andrés Segovia. In 1916, he married Ascensión Delgado Casarreales, a graduate (guitar and violin) of the Conservatorio de Música.

In 1917, as Arthur Rubinstein's music manager for his concerts in Spain and Latin America (from 1916), de Quesada travelled with him from Cádiz to South America on the cruiser Infanta Isabel. Rubinstein performed his Argentina debut concert in Buenos Aires at the Teatro Odéon (Teatro Colón?) on 2 July 1917, in a tour which included concerts in Montevideo, Santiago de Chile and Valparaíso as well.

In Spain, Ernesto de Quesada also created “Associations for Musical Culture,” founding an Asociación de Cultura Musical in each of more than fifty cities in Spain, including small towns where people had never before heard a classical music recital. He also loaned each of them a piano de cola — a grand piano — without asking for payment. These associations nearly disappeared during the Spanish Civil War, as did the pianos.

During the Spanish Civil War and World War II, Conciertos Daniel was primarily active in Latin America, expanding throughout the continent, where de Quesada's sons Alfonso, Enrique, and Ernesto Jr. worked closely with him. (As correspondence in the mid-1940s with members of the Léner Quartet reveals, concert management tasks were not always straightforward or simple.) Ernesto de Quesada's youngest son, Ricardo de Quesada, head of the agency in Madrid since his father died in 1972, reorganised it as Hispania Clásica in 1996. One of the founder's grandsons, Enrique de Quesada, Jr. in Caracas, is its director for Latin America.

Ernesto de Quesada also founded La Sociedad Artística Daniel and La Sociedad Musical Daniel. La Sociedad Musical Daniel was the organizing force on the Latin American side for a twenty-eight-week U.S. government-sponsored ballet tour of Latin America in 1941, which was said by Dance Magazine to have been "the first example of an American government's support of dance."

With fellow impresario Sol Hurok and others, de Quesada was present when Daniel Barenboim (then age 13) and Arthur Rubinstein met for the first time, in Paris in 1955.
