= Gladys Hill =

American screenwriter

Gladys Hill (April 8, 1916 – 1981) was a screenwriter and film executive. She is best known as co-writer of the screenplay for The Man Who Would Be King for which she received a nomination for the Academy Award for Best Adapted Screenplay. She also co-wrote screenplays for The Kremlin Letter and Reflections in a Golden Eye.

Hill's film career began in 1946 as dialogue director on The Stranger, directed by Orson Welles. She went on to be dialogue director on other films such as John Huston's We Were Strangers in 1949, and The Prowler in 1951 which was directed by Joseph Losey. In 1962, Hill became head assistant to Director John Huston, a position which continued through 11 more films with Huston. She acted in three movies in the 1960s and 70s. Hill died in 1981.

== Bibliography ==
- Reflections in a Golden Eye, 1967
- The Kremlin Letter, 1970
- The Man Who Would Be King, 1975

== Filmography ==
Actor

- The Night of the Iguana, 1964
- Winter Kills, 1979
- Wise Blood, 1979

Assistant to John Huston

- Freud, 1962
- The List of Adrian Messenger, 1963
- The Night of the Iguana, 1964
- The Bible: In the Beginning, 1966
- Sinful Davey, 1969
- Fat City, 1972
- The Life and Times of Judge Roy Bean, 1972
- The MacKintosh Man, 1973
- Phobia, 1980
- Victory, 1981
- Annie, 1982
