= Ronald Zollman =

Belgian conductor (born 1950)

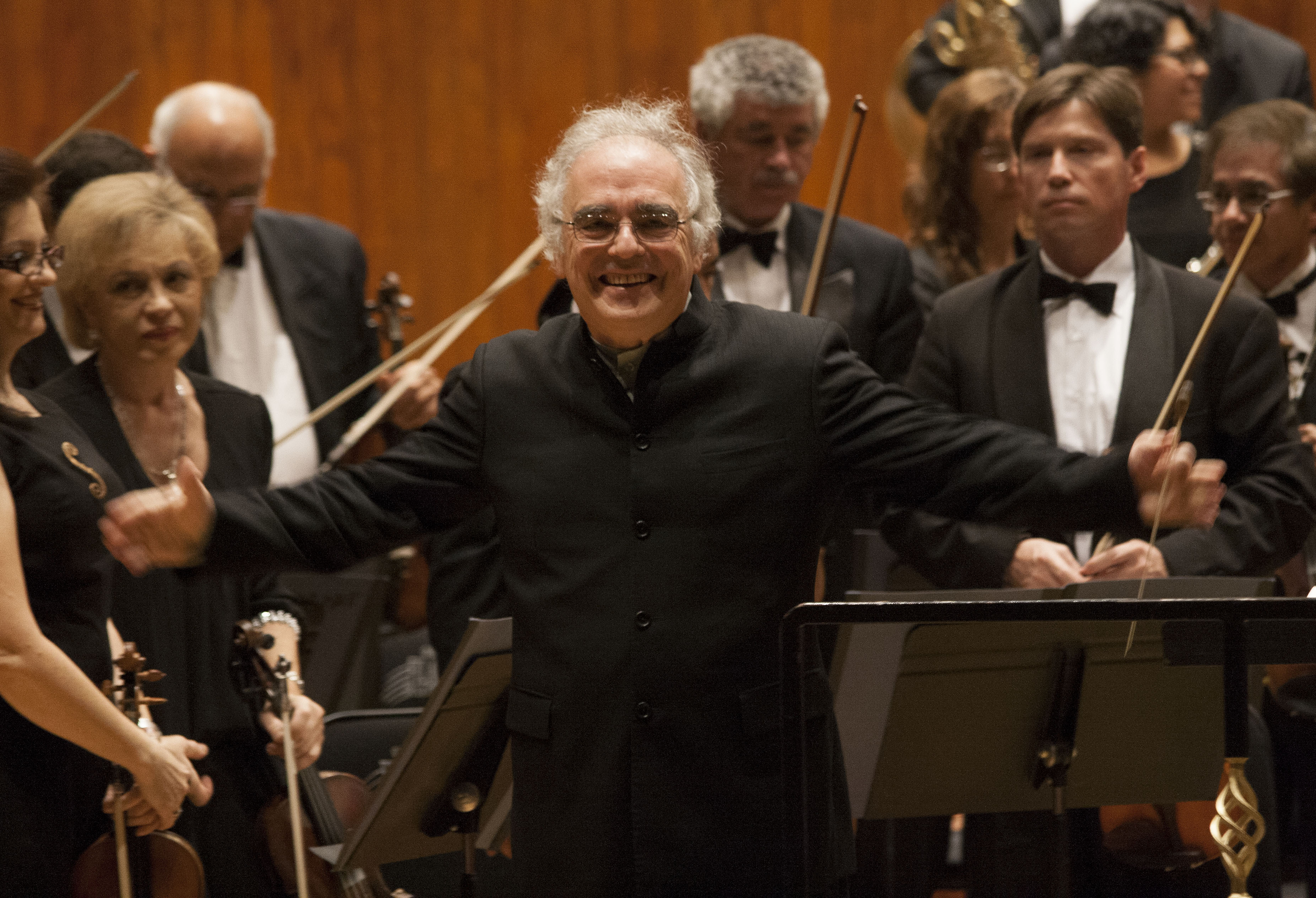
Zollman conducting in Mexico in 2014.

Ronald Zollman (born 1950) is a Belgian conductor.

== Early life and education ==
Ronald Zollman was born in 1950 in Antwerp, Belgium. He began musical studies at age 4. He attended the Royal Conservatories in Antwerp and in Brussels, and later studied with Igor Markevitch and Nadia Boulanger.

== Career ==
Zollman was music director of the Belgian National Orchestra from 1989 to 1993. From 1994 to 2002, he was music director of the National Autonomous University of Mexico Philharmonic Orchestra (Orquestra Filarmónica de la UNAM). From 2002 to 2005, he was music director of the Northern Israel Symphony Haifa Symphony Orchestra, Haifa. In May 2009, Zollman accepted the Associate Professor of Music and Director of Orchestral Studies position at the Carnegie Mellon University School of Music in Pittsburgh, Pennsylvania. In September 2011 he added the position Principal Guest Conductor of the Czech Radio Symphony Orchestra to his activities, and he occupied the same position at the Pilsen Philharmonic Ochesta from 2014 onward. In 2018 he became Music Director of the latter orchestra.

Over the years, Zollman has guest conducted concerts with more than 150 different orchestras on the 5 continents. Among these are the following: Orchestre de la Suisse Romande, BBC Symphony Orchestra, Czech Philharmonic Orchestra, Ensemble InterContemporain, London Sinfonietta, Orchestre de Paris, Tokyo Philharmonic Orchestra, Residentie Orchestra (The Hague), National Orchestra of Spain, Shanghai Symphony Orchestra...

Cultural offices
Preceded by Jesus Medina	Music Director, OFUNAM; 1994–2002	Succeeded by Zuohuang Chen
