= Eduardo Mata =

Mexican conductor and composer (1942-1995)

- Born: September 5, 1942; Mexico
- Died: January 4, 1995 (aged 52); Cuernavaca, Mexico
- Occupations: Conductor, composer

Eduardo Mata (5 September 1942 – 4 January 1995) was a Mexican conductor and composer.

== Career ==
Mata was born in Mexico City. He studied guitar privately for three years before enrolling in the National Conservatory of Music. From 1960 to 1963 he studied composition under Carlos Chávez, Héctor Quintanar and Julián Orbón. In 1964 he received a Koussevitzky Memorial Fellowship to study at Tanglewood. There, he studied conducting with Max Rudolf and Erich Leinsdorf and composition with Gunther Schuller.

He composed several works in the 1950s and 1960s, including three symphonies and chamber works, which include sonatas for piano and for cello and piano. His Third Symphony and some of his chamber works have been recorded.

In 1965 he was appointed head of the Music Department of the National Autonomous University of Mexico (UNAM) and conductor of the Guadalajara Orchestra; He also conducted the orchestra at the university, which later became the National Autonomous University of Mexico Philharmonic Orchestra. In 1972, he left Mexico to take the position of principal conductor of the Phoenix Symphony. The next year he was appointed the Phoenix ensemble's music director, holding that position through the 1977–78 season.

In 1965, he was one of the founding members and later, honorary president of the Mahler Mexico Society (Sociedad Mahler México) and together with Mexico's National Symphony Orchestra (Orquesta Sinfonica Nacional), in October 1975 he conducted the first full cycle of Gustav Mahler's symphonies in Mexico.

From 1977 to 1993 he was music director of the Dallas Symphony Orchestra and guest conductor of several orchestras in the U.S., Europe and Latin America. He recorded over fifty albums, most of them with the UNAM Symphony Orchestra, the Dallas Symphony Orchestra, and the London Symphony Orchestra. He was also appointed principal conductor of the New Zealand Symphony Orchestra and was about to take up this post in January 1995 when he was killed.

On the morning of 4 January 1995, Mata and a passenger were en route from Cuernavaca, Morelos, to Dallas, Texas. Mata was piloting his own Piper Aerostar. One engine failed shortly after takeoff, and the plane crashed during an emergency landing attempt. Both died in the crash, near Mexico City.

== Selected compositions ==
- Trio, for clarinet, drum, and cello, dedicated to Ralph Vaughan Williams (1957) OCLC 13364213
- Sonata, for piano (1960)
- Improvisaciones, for clarinet and piano (1961)
- Symphony No. 1 (1962)
- "Débora", ballet suite (1963)
- Los huesos secos (The Dry Bones), ballet (1963)
- Symphony No. 2 (1963)
- Aires (1964) OCLC 50515055
- Improvisaciónes número 1, for string quartet and piano four-hands (1964)
- Improvisaciónes número 2, for strings and two pianos (1965) OCLC 25201695
- Improvisaciónes número 3, for violin and piano (1965) OCLC 2041840
- Sonata, for cello (1966), dedicated to Adolfo Odnoposoff
- Symphony No. 3, for winds and horn (1966) OCLC 20916143

== Selected discography ==
Mata compositions

- Symphony No. 3, for wind orchestra and solo horn. Orquesta Filarmónica de la UNAM, RCA Red Seal LP recording, 1 disc: analogue, 33⅓ rpm, stereo, 12 in. RCA Red Seal. México, D.F.: RCA Red Seal, 1971. OCLC 38079720.
- "Improvisación No. 2," for strings and two pianos. Orquesta Filarmónica de la UNAM, LP recording, 1 disc: analogue, 33⅓ rpm, stereo, 12 in. RCA Red Seal. México, D.F.: RCA Red Seal, [1970].

Cultural offices
| Preceded by Philip Spurgeon | Music Director, Phoenix Symphony; 1972–1978 | Succeeded by Theo Alcántara |
