= Rházes Hernández-López =

Venezuelan musician (1918–1991)

Rhazes Hernández-López

Rházes Hernández López (1918–1991) was a Venezuelan composer and flutist born in Caracas June 30, 1918. He died in Caracas in 1991.

He composed several works for the piano, including Casualismo no. 6 (1984), and Prisma no. 1 (1979). Many of his works have been published by Ediciones del Congreso de la República, Instituto Latinoamericano de Investigaciones y Estudios Musicales "Vicente Emilio Sojo, Consejo Nacional de la Cultura."

López wrote at least two works for piano trio: Fragmentación cero and Tres Espacios Para Trio, a three-movement work. The latter was performed at the Third Music Festival of Caracas, Venezuela (1966) by violinist Jose Figueroa, cellist Adolfo Odnoposoff, and pianist Hector Tosar.

He composed at least one work for string orchestra, his Las torres desprevenidas (1990). The Library of Congress has copies of recordings of the Espacios and the Fragmentación, scores of the other works, and an authority record on file for this composer.

== See also ==
- Venezuela
- Venezuelan music
