= Giulio Cesare Brero =

Italian-born Argentine composer, music educator, and lawyer

Giulio Cesare Brero (sometimes given in Spanish-language sources as Julio César Brero) (20 December 1908 Milan – 8 December 1973 Milan) was an Italian composer, music educator, and lawyer who was active in Italy, France, and Argentina.

== Education ==
He earned his law degree from University of Milan in 1932. In 1935, he earned a piano teaching diploma from the Philharmonic Academy of Bologna. He then pursued further studies at the Milan Conservatory where he was a pupil of Giovanni Anfossi (piano), Paolo Delachi (composition), and Giulio Cesare Paribeni (composition). He earned a diploma in composition from École Normale de Musique de Paris; studying in Paris with Paul Dukas and Albert Roussel.

== Career ==
As a composer, Brero wrote in a Neoclassical style heavily influenced by his time in Paris. There he had formed close friendships with a circle of composers closely associated with the journal La Revue musicale. His relationship to this circle effected the course of his compositional aesthetic for this rest of his life.

In 1940 Brero moved to Argentina where he was an impresario of music concerts. He joined the staff of the National Conservatory of Buenos Aires in 1944 where he was a teacher of harmony and counterpoint until returning to Italy 1957.

After returning to Italy, Brero was professor of choral singing at the Bossi Academy of Music in Milan. He founded the Opera da Camera di Milano which toured internationally throughout Europe, North America, and to Japan. He died in Milan on December 18, 1973.

== Selected works ==
- "Lyrics", for piano and voice / and for piano and orchestra (1933)
- "Concerto for String Orchestra" (1933); OCLC 20832598
- "Suite", for cello (1935)
- "Lyrics", for voice and piano (1936)
- "Melodies", for voice and piano (1946)
- "Toccata", for piano (1945)
- "Concertino", for cello and small orchestra (1947)
- "38 Songs of Italian folklore", for voice and piano (1949); OCLC 317262499
- "Trio" (1949)
- "Divertimento" in B♭ for flute, clarinet and bassoon (1955); OCLC 20116415
- "Variaciones sobre un tema italiano" (1955), dedicated to cellist Adolfo Odnoposoff; OCLC 315566810
- "7 Preludes," for piano (1954); OCLC 21825759

== Opera ==
- Novella (1953); OCLC 725030310, 551971421, 35756749

== Filmography ==
- Camino del infierno (1946), composer

== Awards ==
1935 — Paris: Prix International de la "Revue Musicale," for "Trio for wind instrument"
1949 — Buenos Aires: Carlos López Buchardo Award by the Wagnerian Association of Buenos Aires for "String Quartet No. 2
