= José Berdichewsky =

- Born: José Berdichewsky Scher; 1919; Santiago, Chile
- Died: 2000 (aged 80–81); Chile
- Occupation: Aviation General

José Berdichewsky Scher (1919–2000) was a prominent army general during the rule of Chilean dictator Augusto Pinochet, as commander of the Chilean Air Force located in Punta Arenas.

== Biography ==
Berdichewsky was born in Santiago in 1919 to a Jewish family who spoke Yiddish fluently.

Berdishewsky served as acting commander in chief of the Chilean Air Force and was a member of the ruling military junta during the absence abroad of Air Force Commander Gen. Gustavo Leigh. He participated in the coup against Salvador Allende in 1973.

Berdichewsky retired from the military in December 1977. He later served as the ambassador of Chile to Israel from August 13, 1980 to January 1, 1983.

In 1975, Berdichewsky was honored at a dinner held by leaders of the Chilean-Jewish community. He died in Chile in 2000.

== See also ==
- Military dictatorship of Chile (1973–1990)
