= Isobel Pravda =

Isobel Pravda is an English actress and the granddaughter of Czech actors George Pravda and Hana Maria Pravda.

== Career ==
Pravda played the female lead, Camille Monet, opposite Richard Armitage in the BBC1 series The Impressionists (2006). She had the role of Misha in three episodes of Murphy's Law (2006) and DC Carla Masters in Double Dare for the series Silent Witness (2007). She played Maria Bopkova in two episodes of Dark Matters (2012) and Anya alongside Tom Hollander in two episodes of the BBC2 series Ambassadors (2013). Pravda's film work includes Bianca in RSA's Someone Else (2005) and a cameo in Kenneth Brannagh's Jack Ryan (2013). Isobel Pravda was the face of Unilever's Neutral skincare range 2013/2014 campaign for Northern Europe. On stage, Pravda played Portia in Julius Caesar at the Menier Chocolate Factory's opening production in 2004. Her other stage work includes: Magdalena in Fighting the Tide for Hull Truck Theatre (2002); Clare in the New End Theatre's Commanding Voices (2002) with Jeremy Child; Lily in Zadie's Shoes at the Finborough Theatre (2003); Miss Bingley in The Good Company's National tour of Pride and Prejudice (2005); Ana in Ana in Love at The Hackney Empire (2006); and Tara in The Death of Cool at the Tristan Bates Theatre (2007). Pravda is currently working as a professional drama teacher in Reading, helping high school students to pursue their admired careers as actors/actresses.

=== The Czech Connection ===
Isobel Pravda's grandmother, Hana Maria Pravda, was a Czech Jew who survived Auschwitz. A diary which she wrote on the Death March was discovered many years after the war and was exhibited at the Imperial War Museum in London. Isobel was asked to do a reading of the diary for Holocaust Memorial Day 2007 at the museum. Tomáš Hrbek, Lucie Kolouchová and Daniel Hrbek from Švandovo divadlo wrote the play The Good and the True, based on her grandmother's diary. She played her grandmother in the 2013/2014 tour to Prague, London, Brussels and New York.

== Personal life ==
Her father, Dr. Alex Pravda, is an academic. He is a member of the Governing Body of St Antony's College, Oxford. Her mother, Imogen Martin, taught Classics and English. She has two sons. She is now a Drama teacher at Reading Girls’ School in Whitley, Reading.
