= OFUNAM =

Orchestra in Mexico City

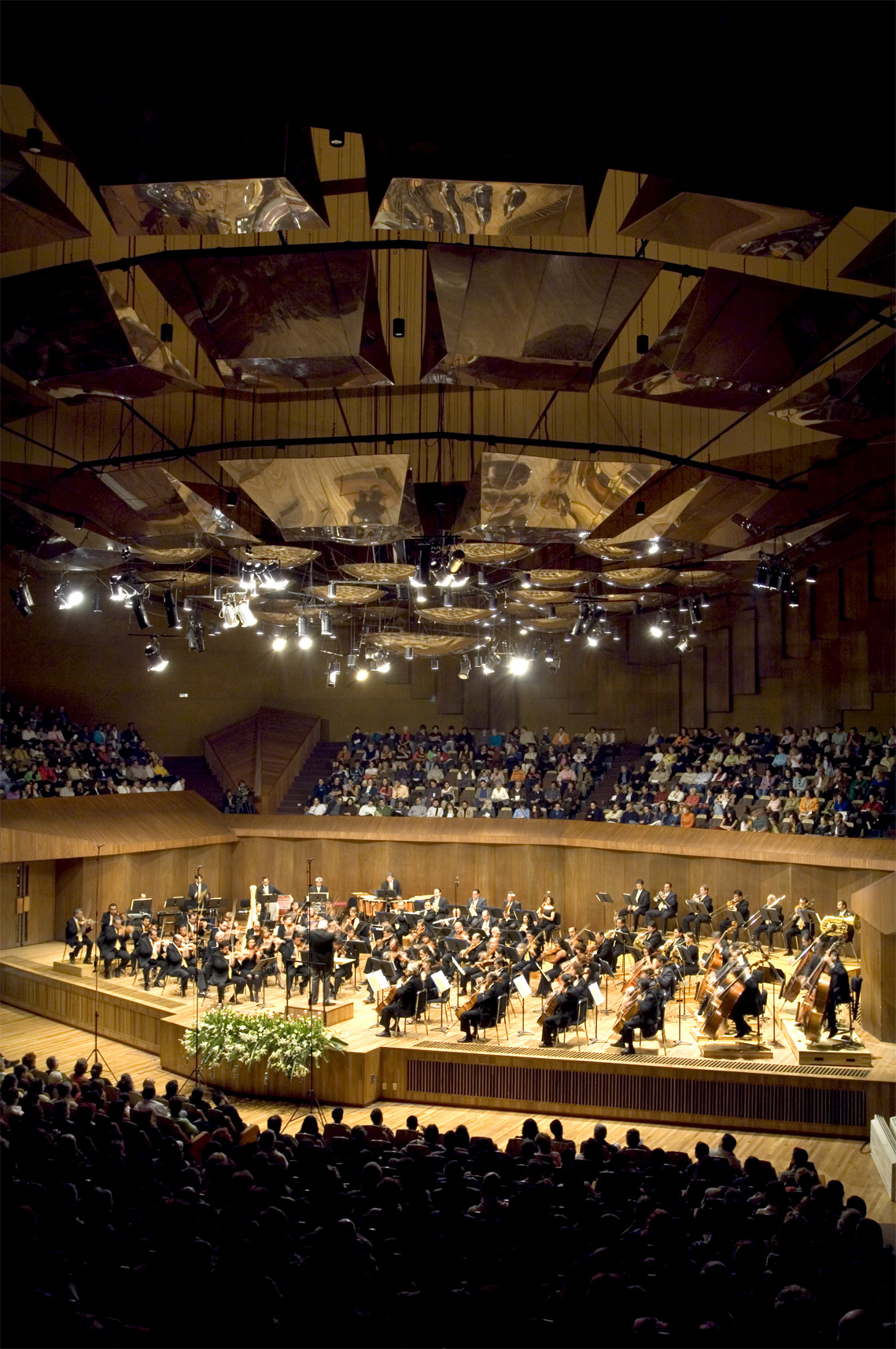
OFUNAM.

The Orquesta Filarmónica de la UNAM (National Autonomous University of Mexico's Philharmonic Orchestra, also known as OFUNAM) was founded in 1936 and is the oldest symphonic group in Mexico City. It is based at Sala Nezahuacóyotl at the University City of the National Autonomous University of Mexico. It was the first orchestra in Mexico to present annual concert seasons. It has become a tradition that the orchestra presents an annual program of Mexican symphonic music.

Some consider OFUNAM to have been created in 1929 when, soon after the UNAM gained its autonomy, a group of students and professors formed an orchestra at the Faculty of Music. However, it was officially founded in 1936, with official approval granted by Lázaro Cárdenas's government. It was originally called Orquesta Sinfónica de la Universidad (University Symphony Orchestra) and was conducted by José F. Vásquez and José Rocabruna. The orchestra was based at Anfiteatro Simón Bolívar.

In 1966, the orchestra moved to a new hall, Auditorio Justo Sierra, at the Faculty of Philosophy and Literature. In 1966, the appointment of a new art director, Eduardo Mata, marked the start of a new period. During this time, UNAM's Symphonic Orchestra became UNAM's Philharmonic Orchestra (OFUNAM). During this period the orchestra’s name was changed and became Orquesta Filamonica de la UNAM. Hector Quintanar was appointed artistic director in 1975. The following year, the orchestra moved to its current home, the Sala Nezahualcóyotl. From 1981 until 1984, the artistic responsibilities were in the hands of a tandem of associate conductors: Enrique Diemecke and Eduardo Diazmuñoz. From 1985 until 1989, Jorge Velazco served as the artistic director. He was followed by Jesús Medina, from 1989 until 1993. In 1994, Ronald Zollman became the new artistic director, a post he held for eight years, until 2002. Zuohuang Chen was the conductor from 2002 to 2006. In 2006, OFUNAM celebrated its 70th anniversary, alongside the 30th anniversary of Sala Nezahualcóyotl, and the 250th and 100th birth anniversaries of Mozart and Shostakovich, respectively. The Welsh Alun Francis followed Chen in 2007, assisted by the Mexican Rodrigo Macias. Presently, Sylvain Gasançon is the OFUNAM's conductor.

== See also ==
- National Symphony Orchestra (Mexico)
