= Enrique Gimeno =

Spanish-Mexican composer and musician

Enrique Gimeno Teixidó
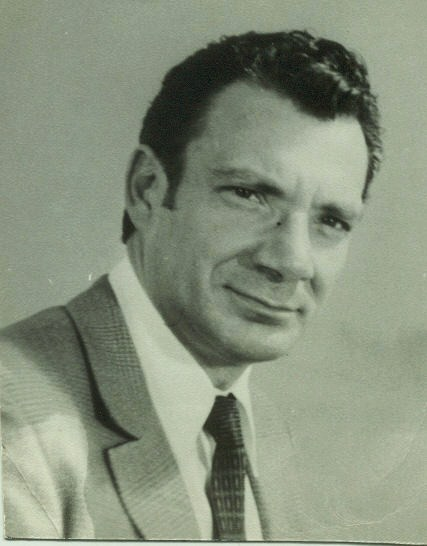
- Born: July 28, 1929; Barcelona
- Died: November 3, 2007; Mexico City
- Occupations: Composer, Conductor

Enrique Gimeno Teixidó (July 28, 1929 - November 3, 2007) was a Spanish-Mexican conductor, music professor, composer, pianist, manager of festivals and cultural activities and Equestrian athlete- who developed his musical work mainly in Mexico.

== Early life ==
He born in Barcelona in 1929, son of Luis Gimeno V. and grandson of conductor M. Teixidó. He studied music from an early age.

Assisted by the musician Luis G. Jorda, he entered the Liceu Conservatory of Music where he studied for a degree in music education, graduating cum laude in 1949. He studied the specialties of concert pianist Guillermo Garganta and conducting an orchestra with violinist and conductor Eduardo Toldrá. Among many other exalted teachers; debuting at fifteen years as director at the Gran Teatro del Liceo in front of the opera Rigoletto by Giuseppe Verdi. He also studied in Germany and France where he was received with honors. In Mexico, he studied dodecafonismo with Carlos Jiménez Mabarak.

== Career ==
In 1949, he arrived in Mexico, as master of music and choral director. He was also accompanying pianist of the nascent TV as well as director and arranger on radio and television. He was for some time, a film and television actor, filming a biographical piece of Ed Sullivan. He taught music in art schools of Luis Sandi. He led for ten years choral mass (with over eighty participants) of Orfeo Catala de Méxic, presenting a series of choral works of leftover interest in such prestigious halls as the Palacio de Bellas Artes and other important theaters in the nation, in addition to directing other choirs from the Spanish community centers in Mexico. In 1954, he was part of the commemoration of the centenary of the Mexican National Anthem. Eventually, he acquired Mexican citizenship.

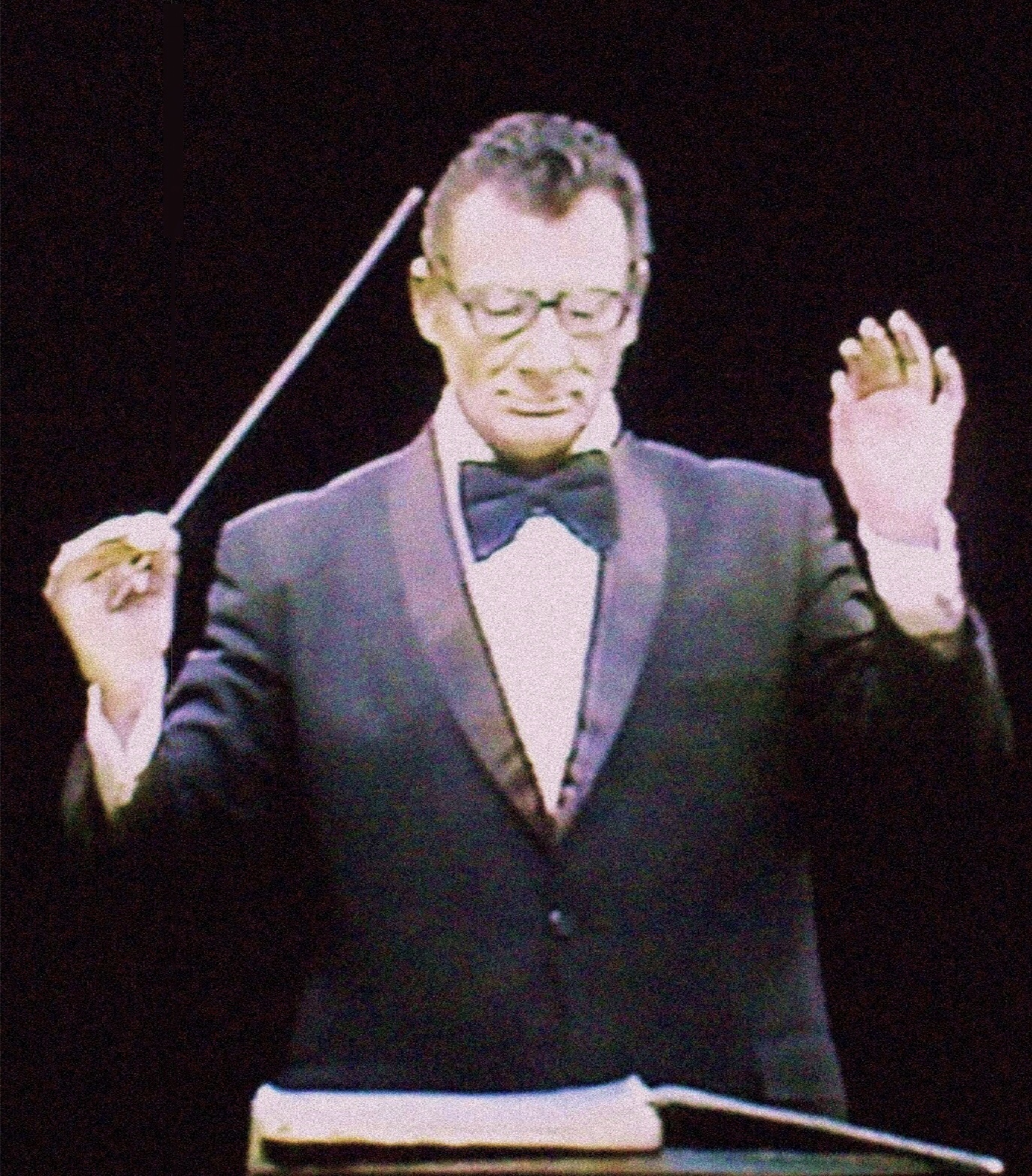
Gimeno directing a televised oratorio.

He founded and directed the Orchestra Manuel de Falla. He made a successful series of concerts to celebrate the first ten years of the "Auditorio Nacional ". For many years, he was professor and associate of the Academy of Fine Arts in Mexico, particularly, as a professor of teachers of music. He practiced musical chair at the UNAM. Gimeno was director on multiple occasions OFUNAM making memorable concerts with it. Between 1969 and 1972, he was CEO of music and cultural activities for Canal Ocho. He directed opera and zarzuela throughout the republic. He founded and directed the Orchestra of Canal Ocho, filming unforgettable series, highlighting the life of Angela Peralta with soprano Ernestina Garfias and celebrated actors, plus a great range of concerts. Gimeno was also director of chamber orchestras, highlighting therewith, the integral of the Brandenburg Concertos of Johann Sebastian Bach recorded in the baroque church of Tepotzotlán, Mexico. Similarly, Gimeno led a host of prestigious international orchestras such as in Los Angeles, the Barcelona Symphony and Catalonia National Orchestra, with the Gran Teatre del Liceu, of New York, The International Pablo Casals, etc.

He established, sponsored and was CEO of the "Festival Pablo Casals of Mexico" in which he conducted several times the eponymous oratory of Pablo Casals, The Crib (alternating, sometimes its direction with the composer and violinist Alexander (Sacha) Schneider). And in 1973, held as a posthumous tribute to Casals, mounting such oratorio, with two orchestras, a range of international soloists soprano Olga Iglesias, cellist Adolfo Odnopossoff and hundreds of singers from the Palacio de Bellas Artes, with the presence of the highest national authorities and eminent personalities, this being televised worldwide. He was one of the founders of the Festival Internacional Cervantino in Guanajuato, Mexico and was its artistic coordinator for three years. He performed countless television programs with choirs, pianos and/or orchestras. He directed the Bach Choir on multiple occasions and formed various student choirs in different colleges.
