= Jorge Jiménez de la Jara =

Chilean politician and physician (born 1944)

Jorge Jiménez
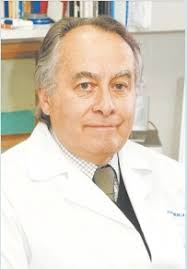

Ambassadors of Chile to Italy
- In office 1995–1998
- President: Eduardo Frei Ruiz-Tagle
- Preceded by: Mariano Fernández
- Succeeded by: José Goñi

Minister of Health
- In office 11 March 1990 – 30 October 1992
- President: Patricio Aylwin
- Preceded by: Juan Giaconi
- Succeeded by: Julio Montt

Personal details
- Born: May 25, 1943 (age 83) Santiago, Chile
- Party: Christian Democratic Party
- Spouse: Margarita Gili Ventura
- Children: Four
- Parent(s): Oscar Jiménez Pinochet; Eliana de la Jara
- Education: Pontifical Catholic University of Chile; Johns Hopkins University
- Occupation: Politician
- Profession: Physician

Jorge Jiménez de la Jara (born December 25, 1944) is a Chilean Christian Democrat politician, MD and former Minister of Health and Ambassador to Italy. He has published over seventy articles and ten books on public health, paediatrics and infectious diseases, and has worked as a consultant for the PanAmerican Health Organization, the InterAmerican Development Bank, the World Bank, the Rockefeller Foundation and a number of other multilateral agencies.

== Biography ==
Jiménez comes from a very political family. His father was Minister of Health under President Salvador Allende, and his sister Mónica Jiménez is the former Minister of Education. He is a physician graduated from the Universidad Catolica de Chile in 1968, who has worked as General Practitioner (1968–1971), trained as Pediatrician in the University of Chile (1971–1974). Practiced and taught Pediatrics, Neonatology and Respiratory Diseases in Children between 1974 and 1990. Trained in Public Health at Johns Hopkins University (1987–1988) where he obtained a MPH in the Hubert Humphrey Program of the US Government.

He was active in public health communication through mass media in the 1970s, a field in which WHO awarded him a Fellowship in 1977. During the 1980s he started doing research in Health Policy at Corporación de Promoción Universitaria (CPU) an NGO, where he developed the Alternative Health Policy for the restoration of democracy in Chile with funding from IDRC and Adenauer Foundation, when he became Minister of Health in 1990 through 1992. In between he consulted in Public Health with the World Bank, Inter-American Development Bank, The Rockefeller Foundation, USAID, WHO and PAHO, among other institutions.

=== Political career ===
As Minister of Health (1990–1992), Jiménez led a team of more than 100 Chilean health experts during the Chilean Health Reform Process. The Chilean Health Reform process has been cited as influential, with impact on other policy development institutions including the World Bank, IDB and WHO/PAHO. In 1992-1993, he participated in three consulting meetings for the preparation of the World Development Report (WDR) of the World Bank, with the direct writers and consultants, in his condition of Minister of Health of Chile.

He was Ambassador to Italy (1995–1998) during the period of Mr. Romano Prodi as Prime Minister, with whom he developed a close relationship. During the same years he was part of the Health in Development Commission of WHO (1994–1997). During this period, he participated in several International Health meetings on a variety of issues related to Health Research for Development. He was nominated Visiting Fellow at the Imperial College School of Management in 1999, and Visiting Professor of International Health at Universita Bocconi of Milano in 2001.

== Current endeavours ==
During the years 1998 through 2001 he was a member of the Executive Board of WHO and its Chairman in 2000-2001. With WHO he was involved in the normal activities of the agency plus active participation in the drafting of policies and diffusion of WHO's more recent reports on critical issues of international health. Among other he chaired the AIDS discussion group at two World Health Assemblies (2000 and 2001), represented WHO in the joint meeting with the European Commission in September 2000 on poverty related diseases that led to important international policy changes related to drug availability for HIV/AIDS, TB and Malaria.

Between the years 2000 and 2001, he participated in the Macroeconomics and Health Commission, led by Professor Jeffrey Sachs in the Working Group 5 on Mechanisms for Improving health outcomes of the poor, under the leadership of Professor Anne Mills. In this period he participated also as Professor in the Summer School of Dubrovnic organized by the European Health Systems Observatory, sponsored by EU, WHO, the World Bank and other institutions. During 2003 he participated and collaborated with Professor Richard Feacham in the design and search for executives at the Global Fund to Fight AIDS, Tuberculosis and Malaria, in which Professor Feacham is Executive Director.

Since 1998, Jiménez has been working as Professor and Researcher in Public Health at the Catholic University where he has been devoted to promote Health Policy issues from an academic point of view, via publications and seminars with students, politicians and PH experts. He evaluated two important Rockefeller Foundation programs (National Epidemiology Boards in 1993 and INCLEN, 1999). Since 2001 he has been the Director of a research project to promote the use of DRG's in clinical management in Chilean hospitals, financed by CONICYT, the National Commission for Scientific Research. His main interest nowadays is Health Policy Research and Promotion in Chile and elsewhere, Research lines are Policy Evaluation of the last 20 years in Chile, especially in successful areas such as Child Survival Second Stage, Renovation of Clinical Management and other policy issues. In Chile he has been permanent advisor in Health Reform to the MoH (2002–2005), and member of the Boards in Nutrition, Vaccines and International Health.

His last intervention was as Advisor to the MoH of Turkey in the implementation of Family Medicine model for PHC. During 2005 he started a Global Health Program at Universidad Católica in a joint agreement with MoH and WHO/PAHO.

Jiménez has published more than 60 articles in several journals and has participated as main author or editor in 24 books in Medicine and Public Health. He is a frequent contributor to Chilean journals in social and health policy issues, seminars and debates conductor in TV and in open fora. Dr Jiménez holds decorations from the Governments of Italy (Cavaliere Gran Croce) and the Order of Malta (Magna Croce).
