= Ana Vásquez-Bronfman =

Chilean/French author and social scientist

- 2000
- Born: Ana Luisa Bronfman Weinstein; 18 December 1931; Santiago, Chile
- Died: 18 November 2009 (aged 77); Paris, France
- Other names: Ana L. Bronfman de Vásquez, Ana Lucia Bronfman, Ana Lucia Bronfman Weinstein de Vásquez, Ana Vásquez
- Occupation(s): sociologist, writer
- Years active: 1967–2009
- Known for: studies involving child-psychology and the effects of emigration, politics and racism

Ana Vásquez-Bronfman (18 December 1931 – 18 November 2009) was a Chilean Jewish sociologist and writer. Exiled from the country during the military dictatorship in 1973, she relocated to Paris, where she worked as a professor and researcher at the National Center for Scientific Research. Much of her literary work centered on the cultural heritage of Jews in predominantly Catholic Latin America, the effects of military dictatorship on human rights and racial prejudices and exile. Her research evaluated the psycho-sociology of children and women's sexuality. She won a National Book prize in Chile for her fiction and a bronze medal from the French National Center for Scientific Research for her scholarship.

== Early life ==
Ana Luisa Bronfman Weinstein was born on 18 December, 1931 in Santiago, Chile to Ida Weinstein Rudoy and Samuel Bronfman. Her mother's family were immigrants from Ukraine and her father's family were immigrants from the Russian Empire. Nicha, as she was called by acquaintances, was influenced and shaped by being the child of Jewish immigrants in the predominantly Catholic country. Studying psychology with a minor in French, Bronfman graduated from the University of Chile. She married Oscar Vásquez Pedemonte and the couple had seven children.

== Career ==
From 1967 to 1973, Vásquez-Bronfman taught at the University of Chile, as a professor in the School of Sociology. When the 1973 Chilean coup d'état occurred, she went into exile, fleeing to France in 1974. She wrote six novels, as well as several short stories, focusing her studies on exile. Working as a therapist with political prisoners and victims of torture, her works explored the effects of politics on human rights. She studied at the Sorbonne, earning her PhD in psychology and upon her graduation became a researcher at the French National Center for Scientific Research from 1984 through 1998.

Vásquez-Bronfman' first novels, Les bisons, les bonzes et le dépotoir (The Bison, the Leaders, and the Rubbish, 1977, translated into Spanish as Los búfalos, los jerarcas y la huesera, 1987), Abel Rodríguez y sus hermanos (Abel Rodríguez and his Brothers, 1981), and Sebasto's Angels (co-written with her son Cacho Vásquez, 1985) each explored a military dictatorship through fiction. Les bisons, les bonzes et le dépotoir tells the tale of one hundred leftist refugees who had taken refuge in the French Embassy in Santiago. Ideologically linked, but differing in almost every other aspect, the book explored the limits on communication. It was selected as a book of the month by Le Monde diplomatique in 1978. Abel Rodríguez y sus hermanos deals with the fracturing of the family, and thus the nation, dividing Chilean society as brothers take opposing sides in the political climate. The novel explores both psychological and physical torture, forced disappearance, and government cover-ups.

Sebasto's Angels evaluates the impact of living in dual cultural realities for second-generation immigrants with the added dimension of being exiles. The book was Vásquez-Bronfman's first novel in which the setting moved from Chile to France and her son, Óscar, known as "Cacho", who was a guitarist and singer of a Latin rock band, lends the story a more youthful focus. Vásquez deals with the pain and guilt of exile, while her son focuses on his anger, rejection politics, and his desire to live in the present moment. It explores the stages of exile, isolation, indifference, and ultimately a loss of identification with one's place of origin, recognizing that one cannot live based on the hypothetical idea that at a future point you may be able to return. In her book Mi amiga Chantal (My Friend Chantal, 1991), Vásquez-Bronfman explores being a double exile in a fictional-autobiographical exploration of community and personal development.

Vásquez-Bronfman's 1999 short story The Sign of the Star, retold the story of a seven-year-old child bullied by his classmates for being Jewish. She tied themes of the Holocaust, such as ghettoization and cremation, to the isolation the child feels when his classmates forbade others to talk with him. Drawing on her own history of being a Jew in a Catholic country, she evaluated Antisemitism from both a cultural and racial perspective. That same year, her Los mundos de Circe (The World of Circe, 1999) was awarded the Chilean National Book and Reading Council prize for best narrative. The work explored shifting relationships of couples, which arise over the course of a partnership, dealing with trust given partially or fully, beauty and ugliness, and the risks that are inherent in love.

Vásquez-Bronfman returned to the theme of her Jewishness in Las jaulas invisible (The Invisible Cages, 2002), evaluating women, their sexuality, and migration on the road to becoming mestizo. Set in the first half of the twentieth century, the novel tells the tale of modern daughters descended of immigrants to Chile and indigenous migrants who have moved from the countryside to the city and explores how all of them are marginalized and reshaped by their experiences. She took these themes further in a collaborative anthology, Crímenes de mujeres (Crimes of Women, 2004), which she edited, along with Virginia Vidal. The title referred to both crimes committed and suffered by women and evaluated the complexity of victimization, perpetration, and institutionalized power.

Her academic works focused on child psychology and she often evaluated the psychosocial development of children through organizations and public institutions, publishing several books on the topic. After her retirement from the National Center for Scientific Research in 1998, she received the center's bronze medal for research and was awarded an Honorary Degree for her research on women's sexuality. This last work Amor y sexualidad en las personas mayores: Trasgresiones y secretos (Love and Sexuality in the Elderly: Transgressions and Secrets, 2006) contrasted and compared the sexual experiences of twenty individuals as they aged. Subjects were from France and Spain and were an equal representation of male and female subjects. Divided into three sections, the first part of the study dealt with the socialization practices associated with sex—fears, initiation rituals, taboos—and the differences between men and women's sexuality. The second section evaluated sexuality as practiced in adulthood and the final portion analyzed the differences the group experienced in their sexuality as they aged. The research shows how childhood influences continue to be manifested in aging populations.

== Death and legacy ==
Vásquez-Bronfman died on 18 November 2009 in Paris, France. In February 2010, colleagues and friends gathered to celebrate her memory. Her works have been translated into Dutch, French and German. In 2017, a literary prize for young women, known as the Ana Vasquez-Bronfman Prize, was launched to assist young writers in publishing their works.
