= The Kremlin Letter =

1970 film by John Huston

- Theatrical release poster
- Directed by: John Huston
- Screenplay by: John Huston; Gladys Hill
- Based on: The Kremlin Letter (1966 novel) by Noel Behn
- Produced by: Carter DeHaven; Sam Wiesenthal
- Starring: Bibi Andersson; Richard Boone; Nigel Green; Dean Jagger; Lila Kedrova; Micheál MacLíammóir; Patrick O'Neal; Barbara Parkins; George Sanders; Max von Sydow; Orson Welles
- Cinematography: Edward Scaife
- Edited by: Russell Lloyd
- Music by: Robert Jackson Drasnin
- Production company: 20th Century Fox
- Distributed by: 20th Century Fox
- Release date: February 1, 1970
- Running time: 121 minutes
- Country: United States
- Languages: English; Russian
- Budget: $6,095,000

The Kremlin Letter is a 1970 American spy thriller film directed by John Huston, adapted by Huston and Gladys Hill from the 1966 novel by Noel Behn. It stars Patrick O'Neal, Richard Boone, Bibi Andersson, Nigel Green, Dean Jagger, Lila Kedrova, George Sanders, Max von Sydow, and Orson Welles. The film is a highly complex and amoral tale of bitter intrigue and espionage set in the winter of 1969–1970 at the height of the US–Soviet Cold War.

The film was released in February 1970 by 20th Century-Fox. It was a commercial failure and thinly reviewed in 1970, but the film has gathered steady praise from some critics throughout the decades since its release. French filmmaker Jean-Pierre Melville called The Kremlin Letter "masterly" and "...saw it as establishing the standard for cinema."

== Plot ==
In late 1969, U.S. Naval Intelligence officer Charles Rone is contacted by "The Highwayman", a veteran spy and member of a freelance espionage ring that sells information to the highest bidder. The Highwayman recruits Rone for an intelligence operation, along with Janis, "The Whore", a drug dealer and panderer; "The Warlock", a culturally sophisticated homosexual; and B.A., a thief.

The group must retrieve a letter, written without proper authorization, that promises United States aid to the Soviet Union in destroying Chinese atomic weapons plants. The letter was solicited on behalf of a high-level Soviet official by a man named Dmitri Polyakov. Polyakov had previously been selling Soviet secrets to the U.S. that he had obtained from the high-level official. Upon learning about the letter, U.S. and British authorities arranged to buy it back from Polyakov. However, Polyakov later committed suicide after being apprehended by Soviet counterintelligence, under the direction of Colonel Yakov Kosnov.

The group blackmails Captain Potkin, the head of Soviet counterintelligence in the U.S., threatening his family to force him to allow them the use of his vacant apartment in Moscow. Once they arrive in the USSR, the terminally ill Highwayman sacrifices his life, attempting to divert the attention of Soviet counterintelligence away from his team.

To ascertain the identity of Polyakov's contact, Janis enters a partnership with a brothel operator, who mentions a Chinese agent known as "The Kitai" as a possible source for names of officials and others to whom he can sell heroin, with which Janis already plans to keep the prostitutes addicted. Meanwhile, the Warlock integrates himself into a community of intellectual homosexuals, starting an affair with a university professor. One of the professor's students was Polyakov's former lover. The student says that Polyakov had a relationship with Vladimir Bresnavitch of the Central Committee.

Years before, Bresnavitch sought to oust Kosnov from his job, in favor of Robert Sturdevant, a primary operator in The Highwayman's old group. Prior to that time, Kosnov and Sturdevant had been friendly, with each one trusting the other to allow his agents to operate in the other's territory. However, with the pressure from Bresnavitch, Kosnov decided that he had to do "something spectacular" to keep his job. He betrayed Sturdevant's trust and captured his agents, earning the enmity of Sturdevant himself. Sturdevant eventually disappeared and presumably committed suicide.

Bresnavitch had used Polyakov to fence stolen art works in Paris, so Ward, an old partner of the Highwayman and a member of Rone's current group, decides to go there in search of leads. On the day of his return, Potkin reaches the Soviet Union and informs Bresnavitch about Rone's operation. Janis, B.A. and Ward are apprehended, while The Warlock commits suicide before being captured. Rone escapes and tries visiting the Kitai to arrange re-purchase of the letter. However, the Kitai responds by trying to kill Rone, who determines that the Chinese have the letter.

Rone then turns to Kosnov's wife Erika Beck, with whom he has been having an affair. Rone eventually realizes that Bresnavitch orchestrated the raid without the knowledge of Soviet counterintelligence, an indicator that he was Polyakov's traitorous Soviet official contact. Rone promises to help Erika escape to the West. She later reports that B.A. has taken poison and is expected to die.

Rone threatens to expose Bresnavitch unless Ward is released. Bresnavitch agrees, and Rone and Ward then arrange to leave the next day. Disapproving of Rone's plans to aid Erika, Ward kills her. Ward then approaches Kosnov. He begins listing the names of agents betrayed by Kosnov, says that the time has come for retribution and shoots Kosnov in the kneecap. Kosnov then seems to recognize Ward, who closes in on him. Kosnov soon begins screaming.

While heading for a plane to leave the country, Rone shares with Ward his conclusions that Ward is actually Sturdevant and intends to stay, having made a deal with Bresnavitch to take over as the head of Soviet counterintelligence. Ward then reveals that B.A. is alive. He offers to release B.A. in exchange for a favor, handing Rone a note that reads, "Kill Potkin's wife and daughters or I kill the girl."

== Cast ==
- Patrick O'Neal as Charles Rone
- Richard Boone as Ward
- Max von Sydow as Colonel Yakov Kosnov
- Bibi Andersson as Erika Kosnova
- Barbara Parkins as B.A.
- George Sanders as "The Warlock"
- Nigel Green as Janis ("The Whore")
- Micheál MacLíammóir as "Sweet Alice"
- Orson Welles as Vladimir Bresnavitch
- Ronald Radd as Captain Potkin
- Dean Jagger as "The Highwayman"
- Lila Kedrova as Sophie
- Raf Vallone as Puppet Maker
- Sandor Elès as Lieutenant Grodin
- Vonetta McGee as "The Negress"
- Anthony Chinn as "The Kitai"
- Niall MacGinnis as "The Erector Set"
- Guy Deghy as the Professor
- John Huston as the Admiral
- Cyril Shaps as Police Doctor
- Chris Sandford as Rudolf
- Victor Beaumont as "The Dentist"
- Steffen Zacharias as "Dittomachine"
- Ludmilla Dudarova as Yuliya Potkina
- Fulvia Ketoff as Sonia Potkina
- Laura Forin as Elena Potkina
- George Pravda as Kazar
- Hana Maria Pravda as Kazar's Wife
- Brandon Brady as "Clocker Dan"

== Production ==
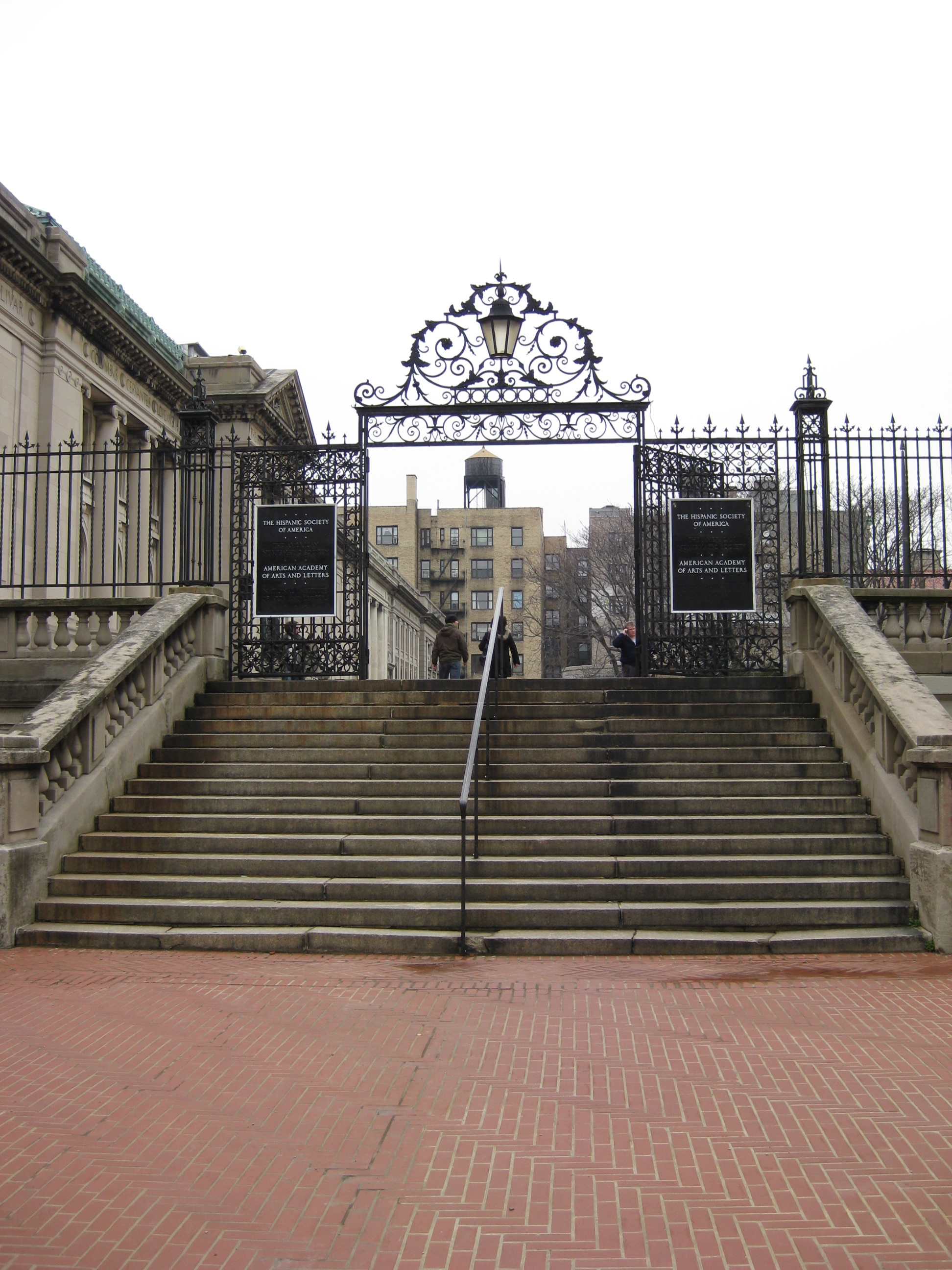
This entrance gate of the Hispanic Society of America in New York was used for a location shot (Rone and B.A. walking into the Tillenger Foundation).

The screenplay by Huston and Gladys Hill was based on the 1966 novel by Noel Behn, who had worked for the United States Army's Counterintelligence Corps.

The film was planned to be shot over 17 weeks, with 13 weeks at Dino De Laurentiis' studio in Rome, Italy; 2 weeks in Helsinki and one week in both Mexico and New York City. Though Huston had wanted to film on-location in Moscow, Cold War politics discouraged him from seeking filming permits, which also scuttled plans to film in communist Romania. Instead, many of the scenes set in Moscow were filmed in the Finnish capital city of Helsinki which featured similar neoclassical architecture. Filming locations in New York included the Hispanic Society of America, Central Park Zoo and Greenwich Village. Mostly aerial stock footage from the summer of 1969 showing Los Angeles, San Francisco, Chicago and New York City is also seen in the film.

The film shows its characters speaking Russian without the use of English subtitles by either having the characters speaking Russian while supplying simultaneous voiced-over English translation or else beginning such scenes in Russian and then segueing into English.

== Reception ==
=== Box office ===
According to Fox records, the film required $10,100,000 in rentals to break even and by December 11, 1970, had made $3,425,000. By September 1970, the studio recorded a loss of $3,939,000 on the film to the studio.

=== Critical response ===
The film was subject to criticism upon its release. Vincent Canby of The New York Times called the movie "depressing." Variety had already noted in a pre-release review that The Kremlin Letter "...makes for valuable viewing, but with the piecing together [it is] another thing. Thus is this nastiness of the spy business graphically described. It is an engagingly photographed piece of business." A much later TV Guide review said the film was "Beautifully photographed... [but] a hopelessly convoluted spy drama with so many intricate interweavings that you truly need a scorecard to keep track of the plotters."

Much later, fan-author Jerry Kutner wrote "Among the films of 1970, John Huston's The Kremlin Letter was as unself-consciously noir as his '40s and '50s work." Craig Butler of AllMovie wrote, "Although it has its partisans, most consider The Kremlin Letter to be a big disappointment... the plot of the novel upon which it is based is simply too dense to be translated to the screen in a film of normal length." Butler went on to note that "Richard Boone really shines, turning in a very fine performance that leaves the rest of the actors in the dust... there are those who will greatly enjoy Kremlin for its twisted plotting and cynicism..."

In 2005, UCLA scholar Bob Hudson noted in the journal Lingua Romana that French filmmaker Jean-Pierre Melville "...used the term magisterial in praise of John Huston's The Kremlin Letter (1970), which he had just viewed the night before the interview. Despite the commercial failure of the film, Melville saw it as establishing the standard for cinema, and explained his quest as an attempt to achieve such grandeur." The Time Out Film Guide calls The Kremlin Letter "powerful... possibly the clearest statement of Huston's vision of a cruel and senseless world in operation."

In 2009, the film was listed in 100 Greatest Spy Movies: A Special Collector's Edition from the Editors of American History.

== See also ==
- List of American films of 1970
