= Julio Montt =

Chilean politician (1926–2019)

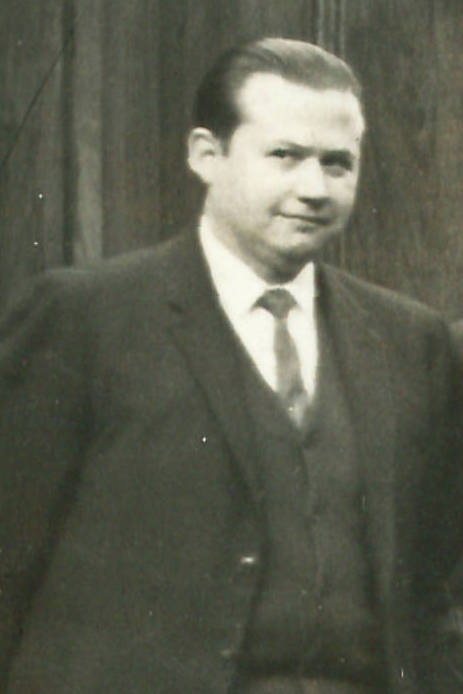

Counsellor of Las Condes
- In office 6 December 2000 – 6 December 2004

Minister of Health
- In office 30 October 1992 – 11 March 1994
- President: Patricio Aylwin
- Preceded by: Jorge Jiménez
- Succeeded by: Carlos Massad

President of C.F. Universidad de Chile
- In office 1985–1986
- Preceded by: Ambrosio Rodríguez
- Succeeded by: Waldo Greene

Member of the Chamber of Deputies
- In office 15 May 1965 – 21 September 1973
- Constituency: 23rd Departamental Grouping

Regidor of Osorno
- In office 1963–1965
- In office 1956–1960

Personal details
- Born: 27 April 1926 Osorno, Chile
- Died: 16 September 2019 (aged 93) Santiago, Chile
- Party: National Falange (1952−1957); Christian Democratic Party (1957−2019)
- Spouse: Adriana Vidal Salinas
- Children: Three
- Parent(s): Felipe Montt; Irma Momberg
- Relatives: Francisco Vidal Salinas (brother-in-law)
- Education: Bernardo O'Higgins Military Academy; University of Chile (BA)
- Occupation: Politician
- Profession: Physician

Julio Felipe Montt Momberg (born 27 April 1926 − 16 September 2019) was a Chilean politician who served as minister of State under Patricio Aylwin's government (1994–2000).

He completed his primary education in Osorno at the German Institute and his secondary education at the Liceo de Hombres. He completed his secondary studies at the Military School. He entered the University of Chile, where he qualified as a surgeon physician in August 1951 with the thesis Production of blocks and atrial filtration by means of acetylcholine and its experimental aspects.

He practiced as a physician at the Hospital San Borja between 1951 and 1952, at the Military Hospital between 1948 and 1952, and at the Osorno Hospital between 1952 and 1965. In addition, he practiced his profession independently in the specialty of surgery. In 1958, he received a scholarship to study for one year at the Heidelberg Surgical Clinic in West Germany. He also undertook advanced studies at the University of Barcelona and the University of Strasbourg.

He worked at the Safety Mutual of the Chilean Chamber of Construction between 1969 and 1976 and at the Institute for Occupational Safety between 1977 and 1982.

He was a member of the board of Indisa between 1979 and 1982 and served as physician and director of the Clínica Alemana de Santiago in 1982.

== Biography ==
=== Family ===
He was born in the Chilean city of Osorno on 27 April 1926, the son of Felipe Santiago Montt Nieva, a native of Freirina, of Catalan descent, who worked as an official of the National Savings Bank, as well as being a 33rd-degree Freemason and a member of the Radical Party of Chile. His mother was Irma Momberg Amthauer, a Lutheran of German descent and the youngest of six siblings.

He married Adriana Vidal Salinas on 12 April 1953—the elder sister of minister Francisco Vidal Salinas, who served under Presidents Ricardo Lagos and Michelle Bachelet—whom he met during his final years of university studies, and with whom he had three children: Julio Felipe (who would also become a physician and politician, and was appointed Undersecretary of Health in 2008), Carlos Alberto (a biologist), and María Adriana (a teacher).

=== Education ===
He completed his primary education during the 1930s at the German Institute of Osorno—where he enrolled at his mother’s encouragement—and was influenced there by the National Socialist wave of the time, from which he later distanced himself. Following a political disagreement with his father regarding contemporary issues—the Second World War—, he transferred to complete his secondary education at the Liceo de Hombres of the same city. Later, following the path of his brother Pablo, he completed his secondary studies at the Military School of Santiago between 1941 and 1944. At the Military School, he was a student of Colonel Arnaldo Carrasco, who would later serve as Minister of National Defense under President Juan Antonio Ríos. After completing a bachelor's degree at that institution, he entered the School of Medicine of the University of Chile, where he qualified as a surgeon physician on 14 August 1951 with the thesis Production of blocks and atrial filtration by means of acetylcholine and its experimental aspects, becoming the first professional in his family.

=== Professional life ===
After graduating, he practiced medicine at the Hospital San Borja in Santiago between 1951 and 1952, concurrently at the Military Hospital of Santiago between 1948 and 1952, and finally at the Osorno Hospital between 1952 and 1965. He served as secretary of the “Osorno Medical Society” in the latter year and as president of that professional association in 1960.

Among other activities, he was also president of the “Chilean Association of Clinics,” the “Chilean Society of Administrators in Medical and Hospital Care,” and the “South American Federation of Health administration,” in which he was a recognized member and vice president. He served as president of the Organizing Committee of the Second Congress of the “Ibero-American Organization of Social Security Providers” (OIOSS), was a member of its Technical Committee, and an honorary member of the Federation of Hospitals of Mexico.

He also practiced his profession independently in the specialty of surgery. In 1958, he received a scholarship to study peripheral vascular surgery at the Heidelberg Surgical Clinic in what was then West Germany for one year. He also undertook advanced studies at the University of Barcelona and the University of Strasbourg.

He likewise worked at the Safety Mutual of the Chilean Chamber of Construction (CChC) between 1969 and 1976 and at the Institute for Occupational Safety (IST) between 1977 and 1982. He was a member of the board of Clínica INDISA between 1979 and 1982 and later served as medical director of the Clínica Alemana de Santiago from 1982 to 1992, and was president of the University of Chile Football Corporation (CORFUCH) between 1985 and 1986. He was also a member and president of the Lions Club. In 1992, he served as president of the “Association of Private Hospitals of Chile,” after having been an active member of that entity for several years. He was also a member of the “Latin American Federation of Hospitals,” the “International Federation of Health,” the “Chilean Society of Surgeons,” and the International College of Angiology.

His final public role related to medicine was at the Chilean Medical College, where he served as treasurer (2008–2011) and as president of its Ethics Department (2008–2014).

== Political career ==
In 1952, he joined the National Falange and in 1957 the Christian Democratic Party (PDC). In 1992, he was appointed president of the Technical Health Commission of the PDC.

In 1956, he was elected as a mayor of Osorno, serving until 1960, and was re-elected in 1963, serving until 1965.

In 1992, during the government of President Patricio Aylwin Azócar, he was appointed Minister of Health, serving from 2 November 1992 until 11 March 1994.
