= Mónica Jiménez =

Chilean politician (1940–2020)

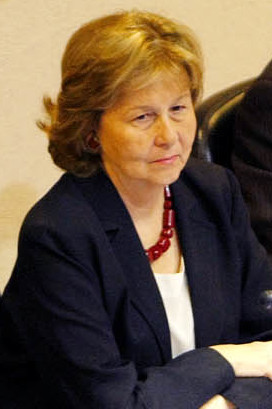

Chilean Ambassador to Israel
- In office April 1, 2016 – 2018
- Preceded by: Jorge Montero Figueroa
- Succeeded by: Rodrigo Fernández Gaete

Minister of Education
- In office April 18, 2008 – March 11, 2010
- Preceded by: Yasna Provoste
- Succeeded by: Joaquín Lavín

Personal details
- Born: December 25, 1940 Santiago, Chile, Chile
- Died: August 25, 2020 (aged 79) Santiago, Chile

Mónica Eliana Jiménez de la Jara (December 25, 1940 – August 25, 2020) was a Chilean Christian Democrat politician and Minister of Education.

== Early life ==
Jiménez came from a political family. Her father Oscar Jiménez Pinochet was Minister of Health under President Salvador Allende, while her brother Jorge occupied the same position under President Patricio Aylwin. Even though she never formally joined the Christian Democrat Party until 2009, she supported it since she was a university student. She graduated as a social worker from the Universidad Catolica de Chile. In 1981, she obtained a Fulbright scholarship that allowed her to complete a Postgrade in Social Work Education at the Catholic University of America, in Washington D.C.

== Career ==
She was a member of the National Commission for Truth and Reconciliation which investigated human rights abuses resulting in death or disappearance that occurred in Chile during the years of military rule under General Augusto Pinochet. She was also a member of the Presidential Committee on Higher Education Certification and the Committee of the Fundación Paz Ciudadana. Jiménez was also the leader of the project "University: Building a Nation", an initiative that unifies the social work of 13 Chilean universities. She was also president of the Educational Corporation Aprender, which runs two schools for socially disadvantaged children.

During her professional career, Jiménez has been dean of Social Work at the Universidad Catolica de Chile, and president of the Teachers' Association of the same university, acting as their representative in the directive council. Before being appointed as Minister of Education by President Michelle Bachelet on April 18, 2008, she was the president of the Catholic University of Temuco. She replaced Yasna Provoste, dismissed in April 2008 because of her participation in the corruption case known as Caso Subvenciones.

In July 2008, during a public debate called "Dialogues for Education" and in the context of a manifestation of repudiation by various stake-holders, the 14 years old student María Música Sepúlveda threw her a jar of water to the face to catch the attention of the Minister who ignored her while she tried to discuss the violent ways used by the police to expel students from the debate. The act was widely rejected by politicians of government and opposition parties, but has generated a mixed reaction in the general population. The student organisations, in particular, have openly supported and revindicated Maria Música's act.

Since 2010 she has been the executive director of AEQUALIS (www.aequalis.cl), Forum for Higher Education. AEQUALIS, is a pluralistic, inclusive and innovative forum, where members communicate, hear and seek to arrive at a consensus in favour of common purposes. In its first stage (2010–2011) was unanimously considered an innovative and relevant initiative that, since civil society helped to analyze and promote policies of higher education. Members (approximately one hundred academics) coincide in appreciating that the social movement of the 2011 was a reflection of a situation of greater social significance therefore it should listen, meet and discuss their demands and incorporate them in a future scenario. Also, the Forum is a space that has made it possible to analyze our reality on the basis of relevant national and international experience in the matter. Currently, AEQUALIS have published eight books with the work they have done from 2010 to 2013.

In 2014, she is appointed Ambassador to the Holy See. She presented her credentials to Pope Francis on June 16, and paid her farewell visit to the Pope on June 4, 2016.

== Personal life ==
Jiménez was married to Juan Barros, with whom they had five children, and who died in 2002, leaving her a widow.

Jiménez died from cancer on August 25, 2020, at the age of 79.

Political offices
Preceded by Yasna Provoste	Minister of Education; 2008–2010	Succeeded by Joaquin Lavin
