= Ninón Lapeiretta de Brouwer =

Ninón Lapeiretta Pichardo de Brouwer

Background information
- Birth name: Ninón Lapeiretta Pichardo
- Born: January 4, 1907; Santo Domingo, Dominican Republic
- Died: September 22, 1989 (aged 82); Santo Domingo, Dominican Republic
- Occupation(s): composer, pianist
- Instrument: piano

Ninón Lapeiretta Pichardo de Brouwer (January 4, 1907 – September 22, 1989), also called Ninón Lapeiretta de Brouwer, was a composer and pianist from the Dominican Republic. She is known for her works for various instruments including piano, wind ensemble, full orchestra and voice. She sometimes utilized national Dominican music as a starting point for her work.

== Early life ==
She was born Ninón Lapeiretta Pichardo in Santo Domingo, daughter of Natalia Pichardo Gómez and Alesandro Lepeiretta, an immigrant from France. As a child she studied piano.

== Career ==
Her earliest works were more traditional canciones, criollas, and dances. In 1940 she began to study under Enrique Casal Chapí, the director of the Orquesta Sinfónica Nacional (OSN) in the Dominican Republic. Lapeiretta de Brouwer continued to compose pieces, expanding to ballets and works for orchestras and ensembles. As director, Casal Chapí often championed native composers and performed their works with the symphony, and Lapeiretta de Brouwer earned exposure both in the Dominican Republic and abroad.

The OSN under Casal Chapí premiered Lapeiretta de Brouwer's work Dos Caprichos for wind ensemble in 1942, as well as her orchestral piece Abominación de la espera in 1943 with soloist soprano Dora Merten. In 1944, her string quartet piece Suite Arcaica was performed at a BBC concert in London commemorating the centennial of Dominican independence.

Lapeiretta de Brouwer also composed several ballet scores including La reina del Caribe (The Queen of the Caribbean).

=== Organizations ===
In 1941, Lapeiretta de Brouwer founded the Círculo de Bella Artes. In 1953 she founded the Sociedad Pro Arte, which worked to bring international performers to the Dominican Republic.

== Legacy ==
Lapeiretta de Brouwer died in Santo Domingo on September 29, 1989.

The Orquesta Ars Nova in Santiago dedicated their full 2004 concert season to her memory, praising her as an important, but often forgotten, part of classical music in the Dominican Republic.

== Works ==
- Abominación de la Espera (1941), for soprano and orchestra
- Pastoral (1941), chamber orchestra
- Obertura Jocosa, symphony orchestra
- Dos Caprichos (1942), wind ensemble
- Suite Arcaica (1941), string quartet
- La Reina del Caribe, ballet score
