= List of ambassadors of Chile to Israel =

Coordinates: 32.109862°N 34.842013°E

Ambassador of Chile to Israel
- Coat of Arms of Chile
- Incumbent; Gabriel Zaliasnik since 4 June 2026
- Inaugural holder: Carlos Diemer Johannsen
- Formation: 1 January 1971

The Chilean ambassador in Tel Aviv is the official representative of the Government in Santiago de Chile to the Government of Israel.

== List of representatives ==
| Diplomatic accreditation | Ambassador | Observations | List of presidents of Chile | List of presidents of Israel | Term end |
|---|---|---|---|---|---|
| 1 January 1971 | Carlos Diemer Johannsen | | Salvador Allende Gossens | Zalman Shazar | 1 January 1973 |
| 1 January 1973 | Julio Barrenechea Divinetz | Chargé d'affaires | Augusto Pinochet Ugarte | Ephraim Katzir | 1 March 1974 |
| 1 March 1974 | Samuel Gleiser Daj | Married to Mrs. Juanita Portugues Guingues | Augusto Pinochet Ugarte | Ephraim Katzir | 15 March 1976 |
| 1 June 1976 | Jorge Gana Eastman | | Augusto Pinochet Ugarte | Ephraim Katzir | 1 March 1978 |
| 16 March 1978 | José Berdichewsky Scher | | Augusto Pinochet Ugarte | Yitzhak Navon | 13 August 1980 |
| 13 August 1980 | Santiago Benadava Cattán | | Augusto Pinochet Ugarte | Yitzhak Navon | 1 January 1983 |
| 1 January 1983 | Víctor Varela Palma | Chargé d'affaires | Augusto Pinochet Ugarte | Chaim Herzog | 31 December 1983 |
| 2 September 1983 | Nilo Floody Buxton | | Augusto Pinochet Ugarte | Chaim Herzog | 1 January 1987 |
| 23 March 1987 | Santiago Benadava Cattán | | Augusto Pinochet Ugarte | Chaim Herzog | 1 January 1989 |
| 5 April 1989 | Jorge Massa Armijo | | Augusto Pinochet Ugarte | Chaim Herzog | 1 January 1991 |
| 1 January 1991 | Marcos Alvarez García | | Patricio Aylwin Azócar | Chaim Herzog | 1 January 1995 |
| 1 January 1995 | Jorge Tapia Valdés | | Eduardo Frei Ruiz-Tagle | Ezer Weizman | 1 January 1997 |
| 1 January 1997 | José Rodríguez Elizondo | | Eduardo Frei Ruiz-Tagle | Ezer Weizman | 1 January 2000 |
| 1 January 2000 | Sally Bendersky Schachner | | Ricardo Lagos Escobar | Moshe Katsav | 1 January 2006 |
| 1 January 2006 | Irene Bronfman | | Michelle Bachelet | Moshe Katsav | 1 December 2010 |
| 1 January 2011 | Joaquin Montes | | Sebastián Piñera | Shimon Peres | 18 August 2012 |
| 18 August 2012 | Jorge Montero Figueroa | | Sebastián Piñera | Shimon Peres | 1 April 2016 |
| 1 April 2016 | Mónica Jiménez | | Michelle Bachelet | Reuven Rivlin | 25 May 2018 |
| 25 May 2018 | Rodrigo Fernández Gaete | | Sebastián Piñera | Reuven Rivlin | 8 January 2021 |
| 8 January 2021 | Jorge Carvajal San Martín | Recalled for consultations since 31 October 2023 | Sebastián Piñera; Gabriel Boric | Reuven Rivlin; Isaac Herzog | 30 October 2024 |
| 30 October 2024 | Patricio Cifuentes | Chargé d'affaires | Gabriel Boric; José Antonio Kast | Isaac Herzog | 4 June 2026 |
| 4 June 2026 | Gabriel Zaliasnik | | José Antonio Kast | Isaac Herzog | Incumbent |
