= Victor Tevah =

Chilean conductor (1912–1988)

Victor Tevah (April 26, 1912 – March 3, 1988) was a Chilean conductor of Jewish-Greek ancestry. In 1961, he acted as director to the Argentine Philharmonic (Teatro Colón); from 1966–1979, he was director to the Casals Festival and Orchestra, Puerto Rico Symphony Orchestra and the Puerto Rico Conservatory; Tevah led Chile's Symphony Orchestra as director and conductor from 1947 until 1985.

== Biography ==
Victor Tevah Tellias was born in Smyrna, Greece (current Turkey) and was raised in Chile. His parents, Jose Tevah and Sofia, had lived in Chile since 1906. Tevah was born during Sofia's trip to Smyrna. His father was a Sephardic merchant from Greek ancestry. He lived in Valparaiso and Santiago, Chile, and also in San Juan, Puerto Rico. Tevah died in Santiago, Chile.

Tevah started the study of violin in 1920 and later attended the Conservatorio Nacional de Musica at the University of Chile. Starting in 1931, he spent 14 months studying at the Hochshule fur Musik in Berlin. Upon his return to Chile, Tevah worked at the National Conservatory and at the National Association of Concerts, organization directed by Armando Carvajal.

Tevah conducted many Latin American orchestras, including orchestras in Brazil, Venezuela, Argentina and Mexico. In 1960, while participating in the Pablo Casals' Pan-American Festival in Mexico, Casals met Victor Tevah for the first time. An invitation for Tevah followed, to conduct the second worldwide audition of Casals' peace oratorio, El Pessebre (The Manger) in Puerto Rico (1962). A few years later, Casals invited the conductor to live in Puerto Rico where Tevah led the Pablo Casals Festival and the Puerto Rico Symphony Orchestra. In 1970, the conductor would be invited by the Catalan musician Enrique Gimeno, to the Festival Casals de México, at Guadalajara, Mexico, as well.

Tevah was a labor organizer in his early years and fought for the Chilean musicians to have decent salaries and benefits so they could be professional musicians. Amongst Tevah's many contributions to music in Chile and worldwide, he is noted for premiering the majority of Chile's new works while director and conductor of Chile's Symphony Orchestra. Between 1947 and 1980, Tevah introduced 192 works, 104 European and Latin American composers and 88 Chilean composers to the stage. Additionally, Tevah recorded 20 Chilean works. Tevah also arranged Chile's National Anthem (1957).

For his worldwide contribution to music and his support to the cause of freedom in Chile, the country he adopted as his own, Tevah received in 1980 the National Arts Award.

== See also ==
National Prize of Art of Chile
Argentine National Symphony Orchestra
List of Chilean Jews
Pablo Casals
Puerto Rico Symphony Orchestra

== See also ==
- Orchestra
- List of symphony orchestras in the United States
- Classical music
- Music of Puerto Rico
- Conservatory of Music of Puerto Rico
