= Hana Maria Pravda =

Czech-British actress (1916–2008)

Hana Pravda
- Born: Hana Maria Becková; 29 January 1916; Prague, Austria-Hungary
- Died: 22 May 2008 (aged 92); Oxford, Great Britain
- Occupation: Actress
- Spouse(s): Alexander Munk; George Pravda

Hana Maria Pravda (née Becková; after first marriage, Munk; after second marriage, Pravda; 29 January 1916 − 22 May 2008) was a Czech actress.

== Biography ==
Hana Maria Becková was born in Prague on 29 January 1916. She trained in Leningrad for a year in 1937. On her return to Prague, she married her first husband, Alexander Munk who was a student activist. Pravda worked in Czech theatre before the outbreak of World War II and made five films (under the names Hana Becková, Hana Bělská, Hana Alexandrová and Hana Pravdová).

When the war broke out, Hana and her husband, Alexander Munk, were sent to Theresienstadt concentration camp and were subsequently transferred to the Auschwitz concentration camp where they became separated. She survived the camp and the subsequent January 1945 death march and recorded her experiences in a diary. She later learned her husband had died.

She returned to Prague and continued to act in the realistic theatre where she met George Pravda. She emigrated to the United Kingdom with him and continued her career. Pravda's most well-known role was as Emma Cohen in the 1970s television drama Survivors. She also appeared as the wife of the innkeeper (played by her real-life husband George) in the Jack Palance version of Dracula (1974)., Death Wish 3, Other TV credits include: Danger Man, Department S, Callan, Z-Cars, Dad's Army and Tales of the Unexpected.

Pravda's wartime diary was published as I Was Writing This Diary For You, Sasha (2000). She also published a collection of autobiographical stories, Kaleidoscope: Snapshots of My Life (2002).

== Personal life ==
Pravda died on 22 May 2008, aged 92, in Oxford, England. Her son, Dr Alex Pravda, is an academic. Her granddaughter is the English actress Isobel Pravda. Her first cousin was the Czech-Chilean businessman Milan Platovsky.

== Bibliography ==
- I Was Writing This Diary For You, Sasha (2000)
- Kaleidoscope: Snapshots of My Life (2002)

== Partial filmography ==
- On the Sunny Side (1933) - Willi
- Marijka nevěrnice (1934)
- První políbení (1935) - Věra
- Nikola Šuhaj (1947)
- The Long Shadow (1961) - Matron
- Before Winter Comes (1969) - Beata
- The Kremlin Letter (1970) - Mrs. Kazar
- And Soon the Darkness (1970) - Madame Lassal
- Death Wish 3 (1985) - Mrs. Kaprov
- The Unbearable Lightness of Being (1988)
- Follow Me (1989) - 2. alte Frau
- Bullseye! (1990) - Old Lady at Seance
- Shining Through (1992) - Babysitter
- Leon the Pig Farmer (1992) - Woman
- The Man Who Cried (2000) - Grandmother
- Paradise Grove (2003) - Ruth Posnitch (final film role)
