= Milan Platovsky =

Milan Platovsky Stein (1922–2012) was a Czech-Chilean businessman and a Holocaust survivor.

He was born into a Jewish family in Prague. His father, Leo Platovsky, was a businessman. His mother, Rosa Stein, came from the Czech bourgeoisie. He lived a carefree childhood. Following the Nazi occupation of what was then Czechoslovakia, like other Jews he was harassed by the authorities, subjected to forced labour and ultimately sent to extermination camps in Auschwitz and Sachsenhausen. He escaped the Nazis in 1944 and made his way to Paris. There he was reunited with his first cousin Hana Maria Pravda, the only other member of his family to survive the war. He emigrated to Chile from France in 1950, while Hana went to Australia and later to England. They remained close for the next 60 years until Hana's death in 2010. Milan published his biography, Sobrevivir: Memorias de un resiliente, in 1997. It became a best-seller in Chile.
