= Alicia Urreta =

Mexican pianist, music educator and composer

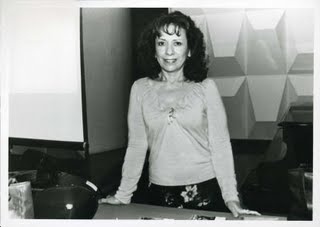
Alicia Urreta

Alicia Urreta (12 October 1930 – 20 December 1986) was a Mexican pianist, music educator, and composer.

== Biography ==
Alicia Urreta was born in Veracruz, Veracruz. In 1952, she entered the Conservatorio Nacional de Música in Mexico City, studying harmony with Rodolfo Halffter, and other topics under Hernández Moncada, León Mariscal, and Sandor Roth. In 1969, she studied with Jean-Etienne Marie at Schola Cantorum of Paris, France. She also studied piano instruction from Alfred Brendel and Alicia de Larrocha. She later worked as a concert pianist for the Orquesta Sinfónica Nacional. She also taught at the University of Mexico and was an instructor in acoustics at the Instituto Politécnico Nacional of Mexico City.

Urreta established the National Symphony Orchestra (1975), was the general Coordinator of the National Opera Company of INBA. music coordinator of the Casa del Lago, musical performances director of the National Autonomous University of Mexico and founder of the Camerata of Mexico. In 1984, she had begun organizing musical festivals to promote Mexican and Spanish contemporary music, collaborating with Spanish composer Cruz de Castro. She premiered her Concerto for Piano and Orchestra with Orquesta Sinfónica Nacional in 1982. She died in Mexico City in 1987.

== Works ==
Urreta composed, among other works, a chamber opera, five ballets, pieces for solo instruments, a cantata, incidental music, a musique concrète composition for Noh theater and film scores.

=== Stage ===
- Cubos ballet
- Luiz negra ballet
- Mujer flor ballet
- Un día de Luis ballet with electronics
- Tantra ballet with musique concrète
- Cante, homenaje a Manuel de Falla for actors, singers, three dancers, slides, percussion and tape, 1976
- Romance do Doña Balada opera, 1973

=== Orchestral ===
- Ralenti for tape, 1969
- Arcana, concerto for amplified piano and orchestra

=== Chamber ===
- Homage for string quartet
- Estudio sobre una guitarra for tape
- Salmodia II for piano and tape, 1980
- De Natura mortis o la Verdadera historia de Caperucita Roja for narrator, instruments, and tape, 1971
- Selva de Pájaros for tape, 1978
- Dameros II for tape, 1984
- Dameros III for tape, 1985
