= Héctor Campos Parsi =

Puerto Rican composer

- Born: October 1, 1922; Ponce, Puerto Rico
- Died: January 30, 1998 (aged 75) Cayey, Puerto Rico
- Genres: Classical
- Occupations: Composer, Director of the Casals Festival
- Years active: 1955 - 1998
- Awards: Gran Premio de Musica, Puerto Rico's Academy of Arts and Sciences (1970)

Héctor Campos Parsi (October 1, 1922 – January 30, 1998) was a Puerto Rican composer. He studied at the New England Conservatory with Francis Judd Cooke, he also studied with Paul Hindemith. In Tanglewood he studied with Olivier Messiaen and Aaron Copland and in France with Nadia Boulanger.

== Early years ==
Héctor Campos Parsi was born in Ponce, Puerto Rico. His father was José Miguel Campos and his mother was Elisa Parsi Bernard. He only had one sibling, a sister, Mercedes Campos Parsi.

He graduated from the University of Puerto Rico with a bachelor's degree in humanities. He then enrolled at the Universidad Nacional Autónoma de México pursuing a degree in medicine, but discontinued his training there for health reasons. Subsequently, he completed a master's degree in humanities at the "Centro de Estudios Superiores de Puerto Rico y el Caribe", for which he wrote a thesis titled Unos bailan y otros lloran (Some dance and others cry).

== Musical training ==
In Mexico City he met composer Carlos Chávez. On a scholarship from the Puerto Rico Department of Public Instruction, Campos Parsi studied at the New England Conservatory in Boston. During the summers of 1949 and 1950 he trained with various composers including Aaron Copland and Serge Koussevitzky, and between 1950 and 1954 Campos Parsi studied with Hindemith at Yale University and with Nadia Boulanger in Paris.

== Writer ==
Campos Parsi wrote articles for several newspapers including El Mundo, El País, El Imparcial, and El Día in the 1940s. He also contributed short stories, essays, and poems to two weekly magazines, Puerto Rico Ilustrado and Alma Latina. The essays included recital and movie reviews, social announcements, and publicity for various student organizations. He also contributed articles for The San Juan Star, The Puerto Rico World Journal, and La Torre, a magazine that he headed himself. He also published essays on Puerto Rican music in Clasicos de Puerto Rico, La Gran Enciclopedia de Puerto Rico, and Puerto Rico A-Zeta (literally, Puerto Rico from A to Z).

== Death ==
Héctor Campos Parsi died in Cayey, Puerto Rico at the age of 75. He was buried at Buxeda Memorial Park in Río Piedras, Puerto Rico.

== Compositions ==
Campos Parsi's major works include Divertimento del Sur for string orchestra with flute and clarinet solos, and the piano work Sonata in G, dedicated to pianist Jesús María Sanromá. Campos Parsi composed works for orchestra and voice, orchestra and piano, orchestra and choir, cords, wind instruments, piano, violin and piano, voice, organ, and choir.

Among Campos Parsi's last compositions for orchestra were:

- in the Music-for-Camera genre:
  - Variaciones sobre un tema de Mozart (Variations on a Theme from Mozart)
  - Turey-areyto
  - Imágenes del encuentro (Images of the Rendezvous)
- in the Music for four solos and piano genre:
  - Los Sonetos Sagrados (Sacret Sonnets)
  - El Libro de Matilde (The Book of Matilde)
- in the Music for Grand Orchestra genre:
  - La Calinda (a ballet)
- in the theatre genre he composed:
  - Los Hechos Desconocidos (The Unknown Facts - a series of 10 vignettes)
  - Laboratorio de Ideas (Laboratory of Ideas)
  - Una Sonrisa en la Isla (A Smile in the Island)
  - Tiempo, sueño y espacio (Time, Sleep, and Space - a mixed work of electronic music)

For the theater he also composed the incidental music for both A Midsummer Night's Dream by Shakespeare, and Dracula by Bram Stoker.

The oldest written composition by Campos Parsi that is preserved is a waltz in popular Latin American style. The title page was written by hand with very artistic calligraphy. It is dated June 13, 1941, and bears the title "Elisa." It is dedicated "to my beloved mother", and the cover has an interesting photograph of the composer and his mother in front of their house in Santurce. The style of this waltz is very similar to the popular Latin waltzes of the time. Divided into short sections that are repeated, its melodic lines have a songlike quality. This work demonstrates that Campos Parsi's notational technique at this time was rather poor. However, despite problems with the use and cancellation of accidentals, and the rather stiff pianistic writing, the music contains some interesting harmonic ideas and compelling melodies.

== Awards and honors ==
In 1954 he received the Maurice Ravel award for his Sonata para violin y piano (Sonnet for violin and piano), a first-prize award in a competition presented by WIPR as well as other awards given by the Organization of American States and the Ateneo Puertorriqueño. Between 1956 and 1957 he continued his studies in New England with Copland and then returned to Puerto Rico.

Campos Parsi undertook an intense cultural promotional work as advisor to the Administration for the Advancement of the Arts and Culture and as director of the IberoAmerican Center of Musical Documentation of the Cayey University College. He was resident composer for the University of Puerto Rico at Cayey, and member of the board of directors of the prestigious Fundación para las Humanidades (Foundation for the Humanities).

== See also ==
- List of Puerto Ricans
