= Esteban Sánchez =

Spanish pianist

Esteban Sánchez Herrero (26 April 1934 – 3 February 1997) was a Spanish pianist. Born in the town of Orellana la Vieja in Badajoz in the province of Extremadura, Sánchez studied with his grandfather, Joaquin Sánchez Ruiz, choirmaster in the cathedral. He went to the Real Conservatorio (Royal Conservatory) in Madrid and studied piano with Julia Parody. He perfected his technique under Carlo Zecchi in Rome and Alfred Cortot in Paris. Sánchez won numerous major international awards, including the Ferruccio Busoni in Bolzano, the Alfredo Casella in Naples, and the Dinu Lipatti Medal from the Harriet Cohen Foundation. In 1954, at the age of 20, he released "Impressions of Spain" by Joaquin Turina on Capitol Records. He returned home in 1978 to teach at the Badajoz Conservatoire.

Between 1968 and 1974 he made a series of recordings in Barcelona, with producer Antonio Armet, of Beethoven, Fauré, Albéniz, and Turina. In 1976 he recorded an album of solo piano music by Manuel de Falla at Abbey Road Studios in London. These recordings have been issued on CD by the Spanish label Ensayo, and the complete Albéniz recordings have been reissued in a budget box set by Brilliant Classics. The recording of Albéniz's Iberia has been critically acclaimed and has been favorably compared to the recordings of Alicia de Larrocha by professional reviewers.

Sánchez remains little known outside Spain, but Cortot called him "a musical genius," and Daniel Barenboim asked "How is this possible? How can Spain have hidden away a performer of this class?"

== Sources ==
- Spanish Wikipedia
- Enrique Franco, "Esteban Sánchez: like a flame," liner notes, Albéniz recordings, Brilliant Classics
- ClassicsToday.com
