= George Pravda =

Czechoslovak actor (1916–1985)

- Pravda in Doctor Who: The Enemy of the World (1968)
- Born: Jiří Pravda; 19 June 1916; Prague, Austria-Hungary (now Czech Republic)
- Died: 1 May 1985 (aged 68); London, England
- Occupation: Actor
- Spouse: Hana Maria Pravda

Jiří Pravda (19 June 1916 – 1 May 1985), commonly known as George Pravda, was a Czechoslovak actor, who appeared in numerous British films and television series.

== Life and career ==
Pravda was born in Prague in 1916. He began his acting career on stage at the National Theatre, where he met his future wife Hana Maria Pravda. He made his film debut in the Czech-language film Men Without Wings, which won the Palme d'Or at the 1946 Cannes Film Festival.

In 1948, a year after the birth of their son, Pravda and his wife emigrated to France. Unable to gain residence, they moved to Australia the following year, where they started their own theatre company. At the recommendation of English actress Sybil Thorndike, they emigrated to Great Britain in 1956. He made his West End debut two years later, in Variation on a Theme.

He appeared in numerous British films and television series. His film credits include: Battle of the V-1 (1958), Thunderball (1965), Inspector Clouseau (1968), Frankenstein Must Be Destroyed (1969), The Kremlin Letter (1970), Taste of Excitement (1970), Dracula (1974), The London Connection (1979), Hanover Street (1979) and Firefox (1982).

Pravda's TV appearances included: No Hiding Place; The Avengers; The Saint; The Baron; The Prisoner; Special Branch; Department S; Callan; Softly, Softly; Doctor Who (in the serials The Enemy of the World, The Mutants and The Deadly Assassin); Doomwatch; Codename; Public Eye; Spy Trap; Moonbase 3; Colditz; QB VII; I, Claudius; The Duchess of Duke Street; 1990; The Professionals; The Onedin Line; Tinker Tailor Soldier Spy; Chessgame and Bulman.

His other West End stage credits included The Doctor's Dilemma, Small Craft Warnings, and I Have Been Here Before.

== Death ==
Pravda died in London in 1985, at the age of 68.

== Filmography ==
- Ill Met by Moonlight (1957) - German Officer Talking to Niko (uncredited)
- Scotland Yard The Mail Van Murder (1957) - Captain Marison.
- No Time to Die (1958) - German sergeant
- Battle of the V-1 (1958) - Karewski
- Operation Amsterdam (1958) - Portmaster
- Sink the Bismarck! (1960) - Damage Control Officer on the Bismarck (uncredited)
- Follow That Horse! (1960) - Hammler
- Reach for Glory (1962) - Mr. Stein
- Playback (1962) - Simon Shillack
- The Password Is Courage (1962) - 2nd German Officer at French Farm
- Hot Enough for June (1964) - Pravelko (uncredited)
- Hide and Seek (1964) - Frank Melnicker
- Ring of Spies (1964) - Secondary Supporting Role
- Thunderball (1965) - Ladislav Kutze
- Where the Spies Are (1966) - 1st Agent
- Submarine X-1 (1968) - Captain Erlich
- Inspector Clouseau (1968) - Wulf
- Decline and Fall... of a Birdwatcher (1968) - Harbour Policeman
- The Shoes of the Fisherman (1969) - Gorshenin (credit only)
- Frankenstein Must Be Destroyed (1969) - Dr. Frederick Brandt
- Taste of Excitement (1969) - Dr. Forla
- The Kremlin Letter (1970) - Kazar
- Underground (1970) - Menke
- S*P*Y*S (1974) - Russian Coach (uncredited)
- The Next Man (1976) - Russian Economist
- The London Connection (1979) - Kolenkov
- Hanover Street (1979) - French Farmer
- Hopscotch (1980) - Saint Breheret
- Firefox (1982) - General Borov
