= Ricardo Odnoposoff =

Argentine-born violinist (1914–2004)

- Born: February 24, 1914; Buenos Aires, Argentina
- Died: October 26, 2004 (aged 90); Vienna, Austria

Ricardo Odnoposoff (February 24, 1914 – October 26, 2004) was a Jewish Argentine-Austrian-American violinist of the 20th century. He was a former concertmaster of the Vienna State Opera and Vienna Philharmonic. He was dismissed on September 1, 1938, because he was unable to produce an Ariernachweis (Aryan certificate). He eventually became a citizen of the United States.

== Early life and studies ==
Ricardo was one of three children born in Buenos Aires to Mauricio (alternate spelling: Moisés) Odnoposoff and Juana (née Veinstein; alternate spelling Weinstein). Mauricio Odnoposoff had emigrated from Russia to Argentina with his father. Ricardo first learned to play the violin in Buenos Aires. Mauricio and Juana Odnoposoff moved to Germany where their children, Ricardo, Adolfo, and Nélida, continued studying music. Ricardo studied at the Academy of Music in Berlin from 1928 and in 1931 studied violin under Carl Flesch and composition under Paul Hindemith. At the end of his studies, at the age of just 17, he first appeared as a soloist with the Berlin Philharmonic Orchestra under Erich Kleiber.

In 1932 he won the second prize at the prestigious Violin Competition in Vienna and in 1937 the second prize in the Eugène Ysaÿe Competition in Brussels. David Oistrakh, who took first prize, reported in a letter to his wife from the Brussels competition: "... when I arrived, Odnoposoff played Tchaikovsky. He played wonderfully."

Odnoposoff was already a follower of Arnold Rosé, concertmaster of the Vienna Philharmonic Orchestra, and taught at the State Academy, where Norbert Brainin, the future leader of the Amadeus Quartet was one of his students.

In 1933, without an audition, Clemens Krauss, director of the Vienna State Opera, offered the 19-year-old Odnoposoff a position as concertmaster.

== Exile ==
After the Anschluss (annexation of Austria into Nazi Germany), Odnoposoff was unable to produce an Ariernachweis (Aryan certificate). He was therefore dismissed on September 1, 1938, from the Orchestra of the Vienna State Opera and the Vienna Philharmonic and had to return to Argentina.

In the early 1940s Odnoposoff moved to the United States, where he gave his Carnegie Hall debut in 1944. According to The New York Times, Odnoposoff "took his audience by storm by the virtuosity, power and fire of his performances." During this time he worked with conductors such as Leonard Bernstein, Arturo Toscanini, Fritz Busch and André Cluytens and worked as a teacher. In 1953 he became an American citizen.

== Return to Austria ==
In 1956 he returned to Vienna and taught until 1993 at the Academy of Music, where Joseph Sivo was one of his students. He produced some recordings with the WDR Symphony Orchestra Cologne under Franz Marszalek, including the Violin Concerto no. 22 of Viotti. On May 2 and 3, 1968 he played Prokofiev´s 1st Violin Concerto at the opening night of the Bratislava International Music Festival, with the Slovak Philharmonic Orchestra conducted by Ludovit Rajter. From 1964 Odnoposoff also taught at the University of Music and Performing Arts Stuttgart, where, among others, Michael Jelden, Alfred Csammer, Michael Eichinger, Helmut Mebert and Rainer Kussmaul were among his pupils. From 1975 to 1984 he taught at the Academy of Music in Zürich.

Odnoposoff played on the "ex Ladenburg" Guarneri del Gesù of 1735. His violin playing was known for its sonorous, yet mellow sound. Many photographs featuring him in concert are considered to reflect a joy and passion he was able to communicate.

His grave is located in Vienna on the Grinzinger Cemetery (Group 19, no. 36A).

== Awards ==
- Austrian Decoration for Science and Art
- Honorary Medal of the Austrian capital, Vienna, in silver
- Medal of Merit of the State of Baden-Württemberg
- Nicolai Medal and honorary member of the Vienna Philharmonic

== Musical family ==
Ricardo's brother, Adolfo Odnoposoff, was a famous cellist in Israel and the Americas.

Ricardo's sister, Nélida Odnoposoff (born 1919), was a critically acclaimed Argentine concert pianist whose European debut was in 1935 in Berlin. Growing up in Buenos Aires, she had been a protégée of the Argentine pianist Edmundo Piazzini (es). In Berlin, she studied with Hansi Freudberg. Nélida concertized until the late 1950s. During the early 1940s, she was associated with the Opera and Ballet of Montevideo and soloed with important orchestras of Latin America.

== See also ==
- Vienna Philharmonic: Period under National Socialism

== Other sources ==
- Oesterreichisches Musiklexikon. Volume 3. (ed. Rudolf Flotzinger), Austrian Academy of Sciences, Vienna 2004, ISBN 3-7001-3045-7.
- Victims, perpetrators, spectators. 70 years later - The Vienna State Opera exhibition catalog of the Vienna State Opera, Vienna 2008.
- "Reviews in New York Times". The New York Times.
