= Luis Sandi =

Luis Sandi Meneses (22 February 1905, Mexico City – 1996), was a musician, teacher and composer.

== Biography ==
The complete name is Luis Sandi Meneses. Born February 22, 1905 in Mexico City, the only child of Genaro Sandi and María Meneses. Sandi did not attend public primary school, but was privately tutored by his mother's sister, Manuela Meneses, who was a public school teacher. Between the ages of six and fourteen Sandi lived in Tacubaya, a suburb of Mexico city. As his interest in music increased, at the age of fifteen Sandi entered the National Conservatory of music where he studied violin with José Rocabruna, an eminent Spanish violinist. Sandi studied voice with Elvira González, and composition with Estanislao Mejía (b. 1882) a nationalist. Sandi also had a composition workshop with Carlos Chávez with whom he studied instrumental conducting.

Luis Sandi conducted in various instances Orquesta Sinfónica de México and Orquesta Sinfónica Nacional. At one time, he focused on composition. From his production, opera Carlota (libretto by Francisco Zendejas) and Bonampak ballet stand out. His continuous contact with Coro de Madrigalistas (which he founded in 1938) made him compose and arrange a wide range of choral works. He is author of many books for music alumni. Sandi was also member of International Music Council of UNESCO, for 1963-1966 period, and member of Consejo Interamericano de Música.

== Works ==
=== Instrumental ===
Solos

- Fátima (suite galante) (1948) (6') - guit.
- Sonata para violín (1969) (10')
- Miniatura (1995) (3') - viola

Duos

- Pastoral - oboe, piano
- Aire antiguo (1927) (13') - violin and piano
- Canción erótica (1927) (4') - violin and piano
- Hoja de álbum (1956) (4') - violoncello and piano
- Hoja de álbum no.2 (4') - viola and piano
- Sonatina para violoncello y piano (1959) (5')
- Suite para oboe y piano (1982) (12´)
- Sonata para oboe y violoncello (1983) (11')

Trios

- Tres momentos (1978) (6') - violín, violoncello y piano
- Variación para tres flautas dulces (1979) - fl

Quartets

- Cuarteto para instrumentos de arco (1938) (9')
- Cuatro momentos (1961) (5')
- Cuatro piezas (1977) (5') - flautas dulces

Quintets

- Quinteto (1960) (6') - flute, clarinet, trumpet, violin and violoncello

Chamber orch.

- Suite de la hoja de plata (1939) (12')
- Cinco gacelas (1968) (8')
- Trenos in memoriam Carlos Chávez (1978) (6')
- Sinfonía mínima (1978) (8')

Symphonic orch.

- Los cuatro coroneles de la reina (1978) (7') - (vers. orch.)
- Sonora (1933)
- Suite banal (1936) (10')
- La angostura (1939)
- Norte (1940)
- Tú Fú (1956)
- Segunda Sinfonía (1979)

Symphonic orch. and soloist

- Concertino (1944) (7') - flauta y orq.
- Poemas de amor y muerte (1966) (9') - voice and orch. Text: Greek epigraphs
- Il cántico delle creature (1971) (10') - voice and orch. Text: Sn. Francisco de Asis
- Ajorca de cantos floridos (1977) (6') - voice and orch. Text: Nahuatl poetry

Ballet

- Día de difuntos (1938) (8') - orch.
- Coatlicue (1949) (12') -orch.
- Bonampak (1951) (20') -orch.

=== Vocal ===
Operas

- Carlota (1947) (30') Libretto: Francisco Zendejas Gómez
- La señora en su balcón (1954) (45')

Voice and piano

- ¡Oh, luna!
- Las cuatro coronelas de la reina (1928) (7') - Text: Amado Nervo
- Madrigal (1936) (2') - Text: Amado Nervo
- Diez hai-kais (1933) (4') - Text: José Juan Tablada
- Canción obscura (1934) (3') -
- Diez hai-kais para canto y piano (1947) - Text: José Juan Tablada
- Canción de la vida profunda (1947) (5') - Text: Porfirio Barba Jacob
- Cuatro cannciones de amor (1955) (7') - Text: Rafael Alberti; Ramón López Velarde; anonymous
- Poemas del amor y de la muerte (1963) (6') - Text: Omar Khayyam; Greek epigraphs
- Destino (1968) (5') - Text: Isabel Farfán Cano
- Cinco poemas de Salvador Novo (1975) (3')- soprano, mezzo y piano

Voice and other instruments

- Rubayaits - voice, trumpet, horn, trombone Text: Omar Khayyam
- El venado (1932) (8') - voice, flute, trumpet, trombone, 2 violins, vihuela, guitarrón, marimba and percussion
- ¿Qué traerá la paloma? (1958) (1') - voice and guitar
- Paloma ramo de sal (1947) (11') - voice and guitarra
- Poema en el espacio (1961) (3') - voice and violoncello
- Ave María (1981) - voice and organ Text: Elías Nandino

Choir

- Silenciosamente (1930) (1') - mixed choir Text: Amado Nervo
- Tres madrigales (1932) (5')
- Quisiérate peor, Nísida, cuenta (1947) (4') - mixed choir Text: Miguel de Cervantes
- Los Xtoles (1947)
- Amanece (1948) - mixed choir Text: Alfonso del Río
- Canto de amor y muerte (1956) (6') - mixed choir Text: Ramón López Velarde
- A la muerte de Madero (1960) (2') - mixed choir
- Cinco gacelas (1960) (6') - mixed choir
- Cantata a la tumba de García Lorca (1977) (8') - mixed choir

Choir and instruments

- Las troyanas (1937) (10') - coro mixto 2 obs, c.i., fg, arpa y perc. Texto: Euripides
- Mi corazón se amerita (1939) (4') coro mixto y 2 pianos Text: Ramón López Velarde

Choir and symphonic orch.

- Gloria a los héroes (1947) (7')
- La suave patria (1951) (7') - Text: Ramón López Velarde
